

78001–78100 

|-bgcolor=#fefefe
| 78001 ||  || — || May 9, 2002 || Socorro || LINEAR || V || align=right | 1.7 km || 
|-id=002 bgcolor=#fefefe
| 78002 ||  || — || May 9, 2002 || Socorro || LINEAR || — || align=right | 1.8 km || 
|-id=003 bgcolor=#fefefe
| 78003 ||  || — || May 9, 2002 || Socorro || LINEAR || NYS || align=right | 1.2 km || 
|-id=004 bgcolor=#fefefe
| 78004 ||  || — || May 9, 2002 || Socorro || LINEAR || — || align=right | 1.8 km || 
|-id=005 bgcolor=#E9E9E9
| 78005 ||  || — || May 9, 2002 || Socorro || LINEAR || PAE || align=right | 7.0 km || 
|-id=006 bgcolor=#fefefe
| 78006 ||  || — || May 9, 2002 || Socorro || LINEAR || — || align=right | 1.5 km || 
|-id=007 bgcolor=#fefefe
| 78007 ||  || — || May 9, 2002 || Socorro || LINEAR || — || align=right | 1.8 km || 
|-id=008 bgcolor=#fefefe
| 78008 ||  || — || May 9, 2002 || Socorro || LINEAR || — || align=right | 1.6 km || 
|-id=009 bgcolor=#d6d6d6
| 78009 ||  || — || May 9, 2002 || Socorro || LINEAR || — || align=right | 8.0 km || 
|-id=010 bgcolor=#fefefe
| 78010 ||  || — || May 9, 2002 || Socorro || LINEAR || — || align=right | 1.6 km || 
|-id=011 bgcolor=#fefefe
| 78011 ||  || — || May 9, 2002 || Socorro || LINEAR || — || align=right | 1.7 km || 
|-id=012 bgcolor=#fefefe
| 78012 ||  || — || May 9, 2002 || Socorro || LINEAR || MAS || align=right | 1.3 km || 
|-id=013 bgcolor=#fefefe
| 78013 ||  || — || May 9, 2002 || Socorro || LINEAR || — || align=right | 1.7 km || 
|-id=014 bgcolor=#E9E9E9
| 78014 ||  || — || May 9, 2002 || Socorro || LINEAR || — || align=right | 2.9 km || 
|-id=015 bgcolor=#E9E9E9
| 78015 ||  || — || May 9, 2002 || Socorro || LINEAR || EUN || align=right | 2.6 km || 
|-id=016 bgcolor=#fefefe
| 78016 ||  || — || May 9, 2002 || Socorro || LINEAR || — || align=right | 2.0 km || 
|-id=017 bgcolor=#E9E9E9
| 78017 ||  || — || May 9, 2002 || Socorro || LINEAR || — || align=right | 2.1 km || 
|-id=018 bgcolor=#E9E9E9
| 78018 ||  || — || May 8, 2002 || Socorro || LINEAR || — || align=right | 2.1 km || 
|-id=019 bgcolor=#fefefe
| 78019 ||  || — || May 8, 2002 || Socorro || LINEAR || — || align=right | 1.9 km || 
|-id=020 bgcolor=#fefefe
| 78020 ||  || — || May 9, 2002 || Socorro || LINEAR || — || align=right | 2.1 km || 
|-id=021 bgcolor=#d6d6d6
| 78021 ||  || — || May 9, 2002 || Socorro || LINEAR || — || align=right | 4.8 km || 
|-id=022 bgcolor=#fefefe
| 78022 ||  || — || May 9, 2002 || Socorro || LINEAR || FLO || align=right | 1.7 km || 
|-id=023 bgcolor=#fefefe
| 78023 ||  || — || May 7, 2002 || Socorro || LINEAR || H || align=right | 1.00 km || 
|-id=024 bgcolor=#fefefe
| 78024 ||  || — || May 8, 2002 || Socorro || LINEAR || — || align=right | 1.2 km || 
|-id=025 bgcolor=#fefefe
| 78025 ||  || — || May 8, 2002 || Socorro || LINEAR || NYS || align=right | 1.4 km || 
|-id=026 bgcolor=#fefefe
| 78026 ||  || — || May 8, 2002 || Socorro || LINEAR || fast? || align=right | 1.7 km || 
|-id=027 bgcolor=#E9E9E9
| 78027 ||  || — || May 8, 2002 || Socorro || LINEAR || — || align=right | 2.3 km || 
|-id=028 bgcolor=#fefefe
| 78028 ||  || — || May 8, 2002 || Socorro || LINEAR || — || align=right | 3.2 km || 
|-id=029 bgcolor=#fefefe
| 78029 ||  || — || May 9, 2002 || Socorro || LINEAR || FLO || align=right | 1.4 km || 
|-id=030 bgcolor=#fefefe
| 78030 ||  || — || May 9, 2002 || Socorro || LINEAR || NYS || align=right | 1.4 km || 
|-id=031 bgcolor=#fefefe
| 78031 ||  || — || May 9, 2002 || Socorro || LINEAR || — || align=right | 2.0 km || 
|-id=032 bgcolor=#fefefe
| 78032 ||  || — || May 11, 2002 || Socorro || LINEAR || NYS || align=right | 1.4 km || 
|-id=033 bgcolor=#fefefe
| 78033 ||  || — || May 11, 2002 || Socorro || LINEAR || — || align=right | 1.4 km || 
|-id=034 bgcolor=#fefefe
| 78034 ||  || — || May 11, 2002 || Socorro || LINEAR || V || align=right | 1.8 km || 
|-id=035 bgcolor=#fefefe
| 78035 ||  || — || May 11, 2002 || Socorro || LINEAR || — || align=right | 1.4 km || 
|-id=036 bgcolor=#fefefe
| 78036 ||  || — || May 11, 2002 || Socorro || LINEAR || — || align=right | 2.2 km || 
|-id=037 bgcolor=#fefefe
| 78037 ||  || — || May 11, 2002 || Socorro || LINEAR || MAS || align=right | 1.4 km || 
|-id=038 bgcolor=#fefefe
| 78038 ||  || — || May 10, 2002 || Socorro || LINEAR || — || align=right | 2.0 km || 
|-id=039 bgcolor=#fefefe
| 78039 ||  || — || May 10, 2002 || Socorro || LINEAR || — || align=right | 1.8 km || 
|-id=040 bgcolor=#fefefe
| 78040 ||  || — || May 13, 2002 || Socorro || LINEAR || MAS || align=right | 1.2 km || 
|-id=041 bgcolor=#fefefe
| 78041 ||  || — || May 11, 2002 || Socorro || LINEAR || FLO || align=right | 1.7 km || 
|-id=042 bgcolor=#fefefe
| 78042 ||  || — || May 15, 2002 || Palomar || NEAT || V || align=right | 1.4 km || 
|-id=043 bgcolor=#fefefe
| 78043 ||  || — || May 15, 2002 || Palomar || NEAT || — || align=right | 1.6 km || 
|-id=044 bgcolor=#fefefe
| 78044 ||  || — || May 11, 2002 || Palomar || NEAT || KLI || align=right | 3.9 km || 
|-id=045 bgcolor=#fefefe
| 78045 ||  || — || May 5, 2002 || Palomar || NEAT || H || align=right | 1.5 km || 
|-id=046 bgcolor=#fefefe
| 78046 ||  || — || May 5, 2002 || Anderson Mesa || LONEOS || — || align=right | 2.4 km || 
|-id=047 bgcolor=#d6d6d6
| 78047 ||  || — || May 6, 2002 || Palomar || NEAT || — || align=right | 4.6 km || 
|-id=048 bgcolor=#fefefe
| 78048 ||  || — || May 7, 2002 || Palomar || NEAT || V || align=right | 1.5 km || 
|-id=049 bgcolor=#fefefe
| 78049 ||  || — || May 7, 2002 || Palomar || NEAT || V || align=right | 1.1 km || 
|-id=050 bgcolor=#E9E9E9
| 78050 ||  || — || May 8, 2002 || Socorro || LINEAR || — || align=right | 4.3 km || 
|-id=051 bgcolor=#E9E9E9
| 78051 ||  || — || May 9, 2002 || Socorro || LINEAR || — || align=right | 3.8 km || 
|-id=052 bgcolor=#E9E9E9
| 78052 ||  || — || May 9, 2002 || Palomar || NEAT || — || align=right | 4.0 km || 
|-id=053 bgcolor=#E9E9E9
| 78053 ||  || — || May 9, 2002 || Palomar || NEAT || — || align=right | 3.6 km || 
|-id=054 bgcolor=#E9E9E9
| 78054 ||  || — || May 10, 2002 || Palomar || NEAT || — || align=right | 2.1 km || 
|-id=055 bgcolor=#E9E9E9
| 78055 ||  || — || May 15, 2002 || Palomar || NEAT || — || align=right | 2.8 km || 
|-id=056 bgcolor=#fefefe
| 78056 || 2002 KP || — || May 16, 2002 || Socorro || LINEAR || — || align=right | 1.4 km || 
|-id=057 bgcolor=#E9E9E9
| 78057 ||  || — || May 16, 2002 || Palomar || NEAT || — || align=right | 2.7 km || 
|-id=058 bgcolor=#fefefe
| 78058 ||  || — || May 18, 2002 || Fountain Hills || Fountain Hills Obs. || PHO || align=right | 5.1 km || 
|-id=059 bgcolor=#d6d6d6
| 78059 ||  || — || May 19, 2002 || Needville || Needville Obs. || — || align=right | 3.3 km || 
|-id=060 bgcolor=#E9E9E9
| 78060 ||  || — || May 17, 2002 || Socorro || LINEAR || — || align=right | 4.3 km || 
|-id=061 bgcolor=#E9E9E9
| 78061 ||  || — || May 16, 2002 || Socorro || LINEAR || — || align=right | 6.3 km || 
|-id=062 bgcolor=#E9E9E9
| 78062 ||  || — || May 23, 2002 || Palomar || NEAT || MAR || align=right | 2.5 km || 
|-id=063 bgcolor=#fefefe
| 78063 ||  || — || May 29, 2002 || Haleakala || NEAT || — || align=right | 1.7 km || 
|-id=064 bgcolor=#d6d6d6
| 78064 ||  || — || May 16, 2002 || Socorro || LINEAR || THM || align=right | 4.7 km || 
|-id=065 bgcolor=#fefefe
| 78065 || 2002 LC || — || June 1, 2002 || Palomar || NEAT || — || align=right | 1.7 km || 
|-id=066 bgcolor=#E9E9E9
| 78066 || 2002 LM || — || June 1, 2002 || Socorro || LINEAR || BAR || align=right | 3.6 km || 
|-id=067 bgcolor=#d6d6d6
| 78067 ||  || — || June 2, 2002 || Palomar || NEAT || — || align=right | 6.6 km || 
|-id=068 bgcolor=#fefefe
| 78068 ||  || — || June 4, 2002 || Socorro || LINEAR || — || align=right | 1.7 km || 
|-id=069 bgcolor=#fefefe
| 78069 ||  || — || June 5, 2002 || Socorro || LINEAR || — || align=right | 4.0 km || 
|-id=070 bgcolor=#E9E9E9
| 78070 ||  || — || June 6, 2002 || Fountain Hills || C. W. Juels, P. R. Holvorcem || — || align=right | 7.5 km || 
|-id=071 bgcolor=#E9E9E9
| 78071 Vicent ||  ||  || June 1, 2002 || Pla D'Arguines || R. Ferrando || PAD || align=right | 3.6 km || 
|-id=072 bgcolor=#E9E9E9
| 78072 ||  || — || June 5, 2002 || Socorro || LINEAR || — || align=right | 3.7 km || 
|-id=073 bgcolor=#E9E9E9
| 78073 ||  || — || June 5, 2002 || Socorro || LINEAR || — || align=right | 3.7 km || 
|-id=074 bgcolor=#E9E9E9
| 78074 ||  || — || June 5, 2002 || Socorro || LINEAR || RAF || align=right | 6.3 km || 
|-id=075 bgcolor=#fefefe
| 78075 ||  || — || June 6, 2002 || Socorro || LINEAR || H || align=right | 2.5 km || 
|-id=076 bgcolor=#E9E9E9
| 78076 ||  || — || June 6, 2002 || Socorro || LINEAR || — || align=right | 2.0 km || 
|-id=077 bgcolor=#E9E9E9
| 78077 ||  || — || June 6, 2002 || Socorro || LINEAR || EUN || align=right | 2.7 km || 
|-id=078 bgcolor=#fefefe
| 78078 ||  || — || June 6, 2002 || Socorro || LINEAR || FLO || align=right | 1.4 km || 
|-id=079 bgcolor=#fefefe
| 78079 ||  || — || June 6, 2002 || Socorro || LINEAR || V || align=right | 1.4 km || 
|-id=080 bgcolor=#E9E9E9
| 78080 ||  || — || June 6, 2002 || Socorro || LINEAR || — || align=right | 2.6 km || 
|-id=081 bgcolor=#fefefe
| 78081 ||  || — || June 6, 2002 || Socorro || LINEAR || V || align=right | 1.3 km || 
|-id=082 bgcolor=#E9E9E9
| 78082 ||  || — || June 7, 2002 || Socorro || LINEAR || EUN || align=right | 3.4 km || 
|-id=083 bgcolor=#d6d6d6
| 78083 ||  || — || June 8, 2002 || Socorro || LINEAR || THM || align=right | 5.5 km || 
|-id=084 bgcolor=#fefefe
| 78084 ||  || — || June 8, 2002 || Socorro || LINEAR || — || align=right | 1.8 km || 
|-id=085 bgcolor=#fefefe
| 78085 ||  || — || June 8, 2002 || Socorro || LINEAR || PHO || align=right | 2.9 km || 
|-id=086 bgcolor=#E9E9E9
| 78086 ||  || — || June 4, 2002 || Socorro || LINEAR || — || align=right | 5.2 km || 
|-id=087 bgcolor=#d6d6d6
| 78087 ||  || — || June 5, 2002 || Socorro || LINEAR || EOS || align=right | 3.9 km || 
|-id=088 bgcolor=#fefefe
| 78088 ||  || — || June 6, 2002 || Socorro || LINEAR || V || align=right | 1.2 km || 
|-id=089 bgcolor=#fefefe
| 78089 ||  || — || June 6, 2002 || Socorro || LINEAR || — || align=right | 2.3 km || 
|-id=090 bgcolor=#E9E9E9
| 78090 ||  || — || June 9, 2002 || Socorro || LINEAR || MAR || align=right | 3.1 km || 
|-id=091 bgcolor=#E9E9E9
| 78091 ||  || — || June 9, 2002 || Haleakala || NEAT || — || align=right | 2.5 km || 
|-id=092 bgcolor=#d6d6d6
| 78092 ||  || — || June 10, 2002 || Fountain Hills || C. W. Juels, P. R. Holvorcem || — || align=right | 6.0 km || 
|-id=093 bgcolor=#E9E9E9
| 78093 ||  || — || June 8, 2002 || Socorro || LINEAR || — || align=right | 6.7 km || 
|-id=094 bgcolor=#d6d6d6
| 78094 ||  || — || June 10, 2002 || Socorro || LINEAR || — || align=right | 10 km || 
|-id=095 bgcolor=#fefefe
| 78095 ||  || — || June 5, 2002 || Palomar || NEAT || — || align=right | 1.7 km || 
|-id=096 bgcolor=#fefefe
| 78096 ||  || — || June 8, 2002 || Socorro || LINEAR || — || align=right | 2.2 km || 
|-id=097 bgcolor=#d6d6d6
| 78097 ||  || — || June 9, 2002 || Socorro || LINEAR || TIR || align=right | 8.1 km || 
|-id=098 bgcolor=#d6d6d6
| 78098 ||  || — || June 10, 2002 || Socorro || LINEAR || — || align=right | 8.6 km || 
|-id=099 bgcolor=#E9E9E9
| 78099 ||  || — || June 12, 2002 || Socorro || LINEAR || MAR || align=right | 3.4 km || 
|-id=100 bgcolor=#d6d6d6
| 78100 ||  || — || June 10, 2002 || Socorro || LINEAR || — || align=right | 4.9 km || 
|}

78101–78200 

|-bgcolor=#E9E9E9
| 78101 ||  || — || June 10, 2002 || Socorro || LINEAR || — || align=right | 2.9 km || 
|-id=102 bgcolor=#E9E9E9
| 78102 ||  || — || June 11, 2002 || Socorro || LINEAR || — || align=right | 5.8 km || 
|-id=103 bgcolor=#d6d6d6
| 78103 ||  || — || June 11, 2002 || Socorro || LINEAR || — || align=right | 7.4 km || 
|-id=104 bgcolor=#E9E9E9
| 78104 ||  || — || June 12, 2002 || Socorro || LINEAR || MIT || align=right | 5.7 km || 
|-id=105 bgcolor=#E9E9E9
| 78105 ||  || — || June 12, 2002 || Socorro || LINEAR || — || align=right | 4.5 km || 
|-id=106 bgcolor=#fefefe
| 78106 ||  || — || June 12, 2002 || Socorro || LINEAR || — || align=right | 1.9 km || 
|-id=107 bgcolor=#d6d6d6
| 78107 ||  || — || June 8, 2002 || Haleakala || NEAT || EOS || align=right | 5.3 km || 
|-id=108 bgcolor=#E9E9E9
| 78108 ||  || — || June 9, 2002 || Palomar || NEAT || — || align=right | 2.5 km || 
|-id=109 bgcolor=#fefefe
| 78109 ||  || — || June 13, 2002 || Palomar || NEAT || FLO || align=right | 1.5 km || 
|-id=110 bgcolor=#fefefe
| 78110 || 2002 MD || — || June 16, 2002 || Palomar || NEAT || V || align=right | 1.4 km || 
|-id=111 bgcolor=#E9E9E9
| 78111 ||  || — || June 16, 2002 || Goodricke-Pigott || R. A. Tucker || GER || align=right | 4.7 km || 
|-id=112 bgcolor=#E9E9E9
| 78112 ||  || — || June 17, 2002 || Socorro || LINEAR || — || align=right | 6.9 km || 
|-id=113 bgcolor=#E9E9E9
| 78113 ||  || — || June 17, 2002 || Socorro || LINEAR || — || align=right | 2.8 km || 
|-id=114 bgcolor=#E9E9E9
| 78114 ||  || — || June 22, 2002 || La Palma || La Palma Obs. || — || align=right | 3.2 km || 
|-id=115 bgcolor=#d6d6d6
| 78115 Skiantonucci ||  ||  || June 20, 2002 || Palomar || S. F. Hönig || — || align=right | 6.2 km || 
|-id=116 bgcolor=#d6d6d6
| 78116 || 2002 NB || — || July 1, 2002 || Palomar || NEAT || TIR || align=right | 4.1 km || 
|-id=117 bgcolor=#E9E9E9
| 78117 || 2002 NR || — || July 4, 2002 || Reedy Creek || J. Broughton || — || align=right | 2.3 km || 
|-id=118 bgcolor=#E9E9E9
| 78118 Bharat || 2002 NT ||  || July 4, 2002 || Goodricke-Pigott || V. Reddy || — || align=right | 5.4 km || 
|-id=119 bgcolor=#E9E9E9
| 78119 ||  || — || July 4, 2002 || Palomar || NEAT || EUN || align=right | 2.6 km || 
|-id=120 bgcolor=#E9E9E9
| 78120 ||  || — || July 4, 2002 || Palomar || NEAT || — || align=right | 2.6 km || 
|-id=121 bgcolor=#d6d6d6
| 78121 ||  || — || July 1, 2002 || Palomar || NEAT || — || align=right | 4.3 km || 
|-id=122 bgcolor=#d6d6d6
| 78122 ||  || — || July 1, 2002 || Palomar || NEAT || — || align=right | 5.9 km || 
|-id=123 bgcolor=#fefefe
| 78123 Dimare ||  ||  || July 10, 2002 || Campo Imperatore || F. Bernardi, A. Boattini || V || align=right | 1.2 km || 
|-id=124 bgcolor=#fefefe
| 78124 Cicalò ||  ||  || July 11, 2002 || Campo Imperatore || CINEOS || — || align=right | 1.0 km || 
|-id=125 bgcolor=#E9E9E9
| 78125 Salimbeni ||  ||  || July 11, 2002 || Campo Imperatore || CINEOS || — || align=right | 5.0 km || 
|-id=126 bgcolor=#E9E9E9
| 78126 ||  || — || July 3, 2002 || Palomar || NEAT || NEM || align=right | 4.0 km || 
|-id=127 bgcolor=#d6d6d6
| 78127 ||  || — || July 4, 2002 || Palomar || NEAT || — || align=right | 7.8 km || 
|-id=128 bgcolor=#d6d6d6
| 78128 ||  || — || July 4, 2002 || Kitt Peak || Spacewatch || — || align=right | 5.3 km || 
|-id=129 bgcolor=#fefefe
| 78129 ||  || — || July 4, 2002 || Palomar || NEAT || — || align=right | 1.2 km || 
|-id=130 bgcolor=#E9E9E9
| 78130 ||  || — || July 4, 2002 || Palomar || NEAT || — || align=right | 2.6 km || 
|-id=131 bgcolor=#E9E9E9
| 78131 ||  || — || July 4, 2002 || Palomar || NEAT || — || align=right | 4.1 km || 
|-id=132 bgcolor=#E9E9E9
| 78132 ||  || — || July 4, 2002 || Palomar || NEAT || — || align=right | 3.3 km || 
|-id=133 bgcolor=#d6d6d6
| 78133 ||  || — || July 4, 2002 || Palomar || NEAT || Tj (2.93) || align=right | 11 km || 
|-id=134 bgcolor=#E9E9E9
| 78134 ||  || — || July 4, 2002 || Palomar || NEAT || — || align=right | 2.8 km || 
|-id=135 bgcolor=#fefefe
| 78135 ||  || — || July 4, 2002 || Palomar || NEAT || NYS || align=right | 1.2 km || 
|-id=136 bgcolor=#d6d6d6
| 78136 ||  || — || July 4, 2002 || Palomar || NEAT || — || align=right | 5.5 km || 
|-id=137 bgcolor=#d6d6d6
| 78137 ||  || — || July 5, 2002 || Socorro || LINEAR || THM || align=right | 7.6 km || 
|-id=138 bgcolor=#fefefe
| 78138 ||  || — || July 5, 2002 || Socorro || LINEAR || FLO || align=right | 1.2 km || 
|-id=139 bgcolor=#E9E9E9
| 78139 ||  || — || July 5, 2002 || Socorro || LINEAR || AGN || align=right | 2.7 km || 
|-id=140 bgcolor=#fefefe
| 78140 ||  || — || July 5, 2002 || Socorro || LINEAR || NYS || align=right | 1.5 km || 
|-id=141 bgcolor=#fefefe
| 78141 ||  || — || July 13, 2002 || Reedy Creek || J. Broughton || NYS || align=right | 1.4 km || 
|-id=142 bgcolor=#d6d6d6
| 78142 ||  || — || July 9, 2002 || Socorro || LINEAR || HYG || align=right | 8.2 km || 
|-id=143 bgcolor=#E9E9E9
| 78143 ||  || — || July 9, 2002 || Socorro || LINEAR || — || align=right | 2.5 km || 
|-id=144 bgcolor=#d6d6d6
| 78144 ||  || — || July 9, 2002 || Socorro || LINEAR || — || align=right | 6.7 km || 
|-id=145 bgcolor=#d6d6d6
| 78145 ||  || — || July 9, 2002 || Socorro || LINEAR || — || align=right | 7.1 km || 
|-id=146 bgcolor=#fefefe
| 78146 ||  || — || July 9, 2002 || Socorro || LINEAR || — || align=right | 1.9 km || 
|-id=147 bgcolor=#d6d6d6
| 78147 ||  || — || July 9, 2002 || Socorro || LINEAR || — || align=right | 4.7 km || 
|-id=148 bgcolor=#d6d6d6
| 78148 ||  || — || July 9, 2002 || Socorro || LINEAR || — || align=right | 5.2 km || 
|-id=149 bgcolor=#d6d6d6
| 78149 ||  || — || July 9, 2002 || Socorro || LINEAR || — || align=right | 10 km || 
|-id=150 bgcolor=#d6d6d6
| 78150 ||  || — || July 9, 2002 || Socorro || LINEAR || EUP || align=right | 10 km || 
|-id=151 bgcolor=#d6d6d6
| 78151 ||  || — || July 9, 2002 || Socorro || LINEAR || — || align=right | 7.0 km || 
|-id=152 bgcolor=#d6d6d6
| 78152 ||  || — || July 9, 2002 || Socorro || LINEAR || — || align=right | 4.8 km || 
|-id=153 bgcolor=#E9E9E9
| 78153 ||  || — || July 9, 2002 || Socorro || LINEAR || — || align=right | 5.0 km || 
|-id=154 bgcolor=#d6d6d6
| 78154 ||  || — || July 9, 2002 || Socorro || LINEAR || ALA || align=right | 10 km || 
|-id=155 bgcolor=#fefefe
| 78155 ||  || — || July 9, 2002 || Socorro || LINEAR || — || align=right | 2.6 km || 
|-id=156 bgcolor=#E9E9E9
| 78156 ||  || — || July 9, 2002 || Socorro || LINEAR || — || align=right | 4.6 km || 
|-id=157 bgcolor=#d6d6d6
| 78157 ||  || — || July 9, 2002 || Socorro || LINEAR || HYG || align=right | 5.7 km || 
|-id=158 bgcolor=#E9E9E9
| 78158 ||  || — || July 13, 2002 || Socorro || LINEAR || JUN || align=right | 3.2 km || 
|-id=159 bgcolor=#d6d6d6
| 78159 ||  || — || July 13, 2002 || Socorro || LINEAR || HIL3:2 || align=right | 11 km || 
|-id=160 bgcolor=#d6d6d6
| 78160 ||  || — || July 13, 2002 || Socorro || LINEAR || — || align=right | 10 km || 
|-id=161 bgcolor=#E9E9E9
| 78161 ||  || — || July 13, 2002 || Socorro || LINEAR || — || align=right | 5.8 km || 
|-id=162 bgcolor=#E9E9E9
| 78162 ||  || — || July 13, 2002 || Palomar || NEAT || WIT || align=right | 2.3 km || 
|-id=163 bgcolor=#d6d6d6
| 78163 ||  || — || July 13, 2002 || Haleakala || NEAT || — || align=right | 9.1 km || 
|-id=164 bgcolor=#d6d6d6
| 78164 ||  || — || July 13, 2002 || Haleakala || NEAT || KOR || align=right | 4.0 km || 
|-id=165 bgcolor=#E9E9E9
| 78165 ||  || — || July 9, 2002 || Socorro || LINEAR || — || align=right | 3.7 km || 
|-id=166 bgcolor=#d6d6d6
| 78166 ||  || — || July 6, 2002 || Anderson Mesa || LONEOS || BRA || align=right | 4.2 km || 
|-id=167 bgcolor=#E9E9E9
| 78167 ||  || — || July 8, 2002 || Palomar || NEAT || — || align=right | 4.3 km || 
|-id=168 bgcolor=#d6d6d6
| 78168 ||  || — || July 8, 2002 || Palomar || NEAT || EOS || align=right | 4.0 km || 
|-id=169 bgcolor=#E9E9E9
| 78169 ||  || — || July 15, 2002 || Reedy Creek || J. Broughton || — || align=right | 2.5 km || 
|-id=170 bgcolor=#E9E9E9
| 78170 ||  || — || July 8, 2002 || Palomar || NEAT || — || align=right | 1.6 km || 
|-id=171 bgcolor=#E9E9E9
| 78171 ||  || — || July 13, 2002 || Socorro || LINEAR || — || align=right | 3.6 km || 
|-id=172 bgcolor=#E9E9E9
| 78172 ||  || — || July 13, 2002 || Socorro || LINEAR || EUN || align=right | 2.4 km || 
|-id=173 bgcolor=#d6d6d6
| 78173 ||  || — || July 13, 2002 || Socorro || LINEAR || — || align=right | 8.6 km || 
|-id=174 bgcolor=#E9E9E9
| 78174 ||  || — || July 13, 2002 || Socorro || LINEAR || MAR || align=right | 2.6 km || 
|-id=175 bgcolor=#d6d6d6
| 78175 ||  || — || July 13, 2002 || Socorro || LINEAR || ALA || align=right | 11 km || 
|-id=176 bgcolor=#d6d6d6
| 78176 ||  || — || July 13, 2002 || Socorro || LINEAR || — || align=right | 7.7 km || 
|-id=177 bgcolor=#E9E9E9
| 78177 ||  || — || July 13, 2002 || Socorro || LINEAR || — || align=right | 4.7 km || 
|-id=178 bgcolor=#fefefe
| 78178 ||  || — || July 14, 2002 || Palomar || NEAT || — || align=right | 2.0 km || 
|-id=179 bgcolor=#d6d6d6
| 78179 ||  || — || July 14, 2002 || Palomar || NEAT || THM || align=right | 3.6 km || 
|-id=180 bgcolor=#d6d6d6
| 78180 ||  || — || July 9, 2002 || Socorro || LINEAR || EOS || align=right | 4.4 km || 
|-id=181 bgcolor=#E9E9E9
| 78181 ||  || — || July 9, 2002 || Socorro || LINEAR || — || align=right | 4.2 km || 
|-id=182 bgcolor=#d6d6d6
| 78182 ||  || — || July 9, 2002 || Socorro || LINEAR || — || align=right | 7.5 km || 
|-id=183 bgcolor=#d6d6d6
| 78183 ||  || — || July 9, 2002 || Socorro || LINEAR || — || align=right | 6.6 km || 
|-id=184 bgcolor=#E9E9E9
| 78184 ||  || — || July 9, 2002 || Socorro || LINEAR || JUN || align=right | 2.9 km || 
|-id=185 bgcolor=#d6d6d6
| 78185 ||  || — || July 9, 2002 || Socorro || LINEAR || EOS || align=right | 4.3 km || 
|-id=186 bgcolor=#d6d6d6
| 78186 ||  || — || July 9, 2002 || Socorro || LINEAR || — || align=right | 9.5 km || 
|-id=187 bgcolor=#E9E9E9
| 78187 ||  || — || July 11, 2002 || Socorro || LINEAR || — || align=right | 3.1 km || 
|-id=188 bgcolor=#d6d6d6
| 78188 ||  || — || July 13, 2002 || Socorro || LINEAR || ALA || align=right | 10 km || 
|-id=189 bgcolor=#d6d6d6
| 78189 ||  || — || July 14, 2002 || Palomar || NEAT || — || align=right | 5.0 km || 
|-id=190 bgcolor=#d6d6d6
| 78190 ||  || — || July 14, 2002 || Palomar || NEAT || — || align=right | 5.1 km || 
|-id=191 bgcolor=#fefefe
| 78191 ||  || — || July 13, 2002 || Haleakala || NEAT || V || align=right | 1.8 km || 
|-id=192 bgcolor=#E9E9E9
| 78192 ||  || — || July 14, 2002 || Palomar || NEAT || AGN || align=right | 2.7 km || 
|-id=193 bgcolor=#E9E9E9
| 78193 ||  || — || July 14, 2002 || Palomar || NEAT || EUN || align=right | 2.6 km || 
|-id=194 bgcolor=#d6d6d6
| 78194 ||  || — || July 15, 2002 || Palomar || NEAT || — || align=right | 6.2 km || 
|-id=195 bgcolor=#E9E9E9
| 78195 ||  || — || July 15, 2002 || Palomar || NEAT || JUN || align=right | 2.4 km || 
|-id=196 bgcolor=#E9E9E9
| 78196 ||  || — || July 9, 2002 || Socorro || LINEAR || — || align=right | 2.7 km || 
|-id=197 bgcolor=#E9E9E9
| 78197 ||  || — || July 12, 2002 || Palomar || NEAT || — || align=right | 2.3 km || 
|-id=198 bgcolor=#d6d6d6
| 78198 ||  || — || July 14, 2002 || Socorro || LINEAR || EOS || align=right | 4.1 km || 
|-id=199 bgcolor=#E9E9E9
| 78199 ||  || — || July 13, 2002 || Haleakala || NEAT || GEF || align=right | 2.7 km || 
|-id=200 bgcolor=#d6d6d6
| 78200 ||  || — || July 14, 2002 || Socorro || LINEAR || — || align=right | 4.5 km || 
|}

78201–78300 

|-bgcolor=#d6d6d6
| 78201 ||  || — || July 14, 2002 || Palomar || NEAT || — || align=right | 5.0 km || 
|-id=202 bgcolor=#d6d6d6
| 78202 ||  || — || July 13, 2002 || Haleakala || NEAT || EOS || align=right | 4.5 km || 
|-id=203 bgcolor=#d6d6d6
| 78203 ||  || — || July 15, 2002 || Palomar || NEAT || — || align=right | 8.9 km || 
|-id=204 bgcolor=#fefefe
| 78204 ||  || — || July 15, 2002 || Palomar || NEAT || V || align=right | 1.3 km || 
|-id=205 bgcolor=#d6d6d6
| 78205 ||  || — || July 4, 2002 || Palomar || NEAT || EOS || align=right | 4.1 km || 
|-id=206 bgcolor=#d6d6d6
| 78206 ||  || — || July 5, 2002 || Socorro || LINEAR || — || align=right | 6.5 km || 
|-id=207 bgcolor=#E9E9E9
| 78207 ||  || — || July 12, 2002 || Palomar || NEAT || — || align=right | 4.9 km || 
|-id=208 bgcolor=#E9E9E9
| 78208 ||  || — || July 11, 2002 || Socorro || LINEAR || MAR || align=right | 2.3 km || 
|-id=209 bgcolor=#d6d6d6
| 78209 || 2002 OA || — || July 16, 2002 || Reedy Creek || J. Broughton || — || align=right | 5.5 km || 
|-id=210 bgcolor=#d6d6d6
| 78210 || 2002 OT || — || July 17, 2002 || Socorro || LINEAR || — || align=right | 6.0 km || 
|-id=211 bgcolor=#d6d6d6
| 78211 || 2002 OY || — || July 17, 2002 || Socorro || LINEAR || — || align=right | 5.1 km || 
|-id=212 bgcolor=#d6d6d6
| 78212 ||  || — || July 17, 2002 || Socorro || LINEAR || — || align=right | 4.3 km || 
|-id=213 bgcolor=#d6d6d6
| 78213 ||  || — || July 17, 2002 || Socorro || LINEAR || — || align=right | 8.5 km || 
|-id=214 bgcolor=#E9E9E9
| 78214 ||  || — || July 17, 2002 || Socorro || LINEAR || MAR || align=right | 2.6 km || 
|-id=215 bgcolor=#E9E9E9
| 78215 ||  || — || July 17, 2002 || Socorro || LINEAR || — || align=right | 4.0 km || 
|-id=216 bgcolor=#fefefe
| 78216 ||  || — || July 17, 2002 || Socorro || LINEAR || V || align=right | 1.8 km || 
|-id=217 bgcolor=#fefefe
| 78217 ||  || — || July 18, 2002 || Palomar || NEAT || — || align=right | 4.5 km || 
|-id=218 bgcolor=#d6d6d6
| 78218 ||  || — || July 19, 2002 || Palomar || NEAT || — || align=right | 7.0 km || 
|-id=219 bgcolor=#E9E9E9
| 78219 ||  || — || July 19, 2002 || Palomar || NEAT || — || align=right | 2.0 km || 
|-id=220 bgcolor=#d6d6d6
| 78220 ||  || — || July 20, 2002 || Palomar || NEAT || — || align=right | 5.9 km || 
|-id=221 bgcolor=#E9E9E9
| 78221 Leonmow ||  ||  || July 18, 2002 || Needville || Needville Obs. || — || align=right | 5.0 km || 
|-id=222 bgcolor=#E9E9E9
| 78222 ||  || — || July 18, 2002 || Palomar || NEAT || HEN || align=right | 2.2 km || 
|-id=223 bgcolor=#E9E9E9
| 78223 ||  || — || July 21, 2002 || Palomar || NEAT || PAD || align=right | 4.4 km || 
|-id=224 bgcolor=#d6d6d6
| 78224 ||  || — || July 21, 2002 || Palomar || NEAT || — || align=right | 7.2 km || 
|-id=225 bgcolor=#d6d6d6
| 78225 ||  || — || July 22, 2002 || Palomar || NEAT || — || align=right | 4.7 km || 
|-id=226 bgcolor=#fefefe
| 78226 ||  || — || July 16, 2002 || Palomar || NEAT || — || align=right | 1.9 km || 
|-id=227 bgcolor=#E9E9E9
| 78227 ||  || — || July 18, 2002 || Socorro || LINEAR || — || align=right | 2.0 km || 
|-id=228 bgcolor=#E9E9E9
| 78228 ||  || — || July 18, 2002 || Socorro || LINEAR || — || align=right | 2.1 km || 
|-id=229 bgcolor=#E9E9E9
| 78229 ||  || — || July 18, 2002 || Socorro || LINEAR || EUN || align=right | 2.3 km || 
|-id=230 bgcolor=#d6d6d6
| 78230 ||  || — || July 18, 2002 || Socorro || LINEAR || — || align=right | 7.8 km || 
|-id=231 bgcolor=#d6d6d6
| 78231 ||  || — || July 18, 2002 || Socorro || LINEAR || LIX || align=right | 8.0 km || 
|-id=232 bgcolor=#d6d6d6
| 78232 ||  || — || July 18, 2002 || Socorro || LINEAR || — || align=right | 4.4 km || 
|-id=233 bgcolor=#d6d6d6
| 78233 ||  || — || July 18, 2002 || Socorro || LINEAR || EOS || align=right | 4.6 km || 
|-id=234 bgcolor=#d6d6d6
| 78234 ||  || — || July 18, 2002 || Socorro || LINEAR || EOS || align=right | 4.2 km || 
|-id=235 bgcolor=#E9E9E9
| 78235 ||  || — || July 18, 2002 || Socorro || LINEAR || ADE || align=right | 5.4 km || 
|-id=236 bgcolor=#fefefe
| 78236 ||  || — || July 21, 2002 || Palomar || NEAT || — || align=right | 1.5 km || 
|-id=237 bgcolor=#d6d6d6
| 78237 ||  || — || July 28, 2002 || Palomar || NEAT || slow || align=right | 5.1 km || 
|-id=238 bgcolor=#E9E9E9
| 78238 ||  || — || July 23, 2002 || Palomar || NEAT || — || align=right | 5.3 km || 
|-id=239 bgcolor=#d6d6d6
| 78239 ||  || — || July 22, 2002 || Palomar || NEAT || THM || align=right | 5.0 km || 
|-id=240 bgcolor=#fefefe
| 78240 ||  || — || July 31, 2002 || Reedy Creek || J. Broughton || — || align=right | 1.6 km || 
|-id=241 bgcolor=#E9E9E9
| 78241 ||  || — || July 29, 2002 || Palomar || NEAT || — || align=right | 5.6 km || 
|-id=242 bgcolor=#d6d6d6
| 78242 ||  || — || July 28, 2002 || Haleakala || NEAT || — || align=right | 14 km || 
|-id=243 bgcolor=#d6d6d6
| 78243 || 2002 PV || — || August 1, 2002 || Socorro || LINEAR || — || align=right | 9.4 km || 
|-id=244 bgcolor=#fefefe
| 78244 ||  || — || August 2, 2002 || El Centro || W. K. Y. Yeung || — || align=right | 1.6 km || 
|-id=245 bgcolor=#d6d6d6
| 78245 ||  || — || August 3, 2002 || Palomar || NEAT || — || align=right | 6.1 km || 
|-id=246 bgcolor=#d6d6d6
| 78246 ||  || — || August 3, 2002 || Palomar || NEAT || — || align=right | 8.0 km || 
|-id=247 bgcolor=#d6d6d6
| 78247 ||  || — || August 3, 2002 || Palomar || NEAT || CRO || align=right | 6.4 km || 
|-id=248 bgcolor=#d6d6d6
| 78248 ||  || — || August 4, 2002 || Palomar || NEAT || — || align=right | 6.4 km || 
|-id=249 bgcolor=#d6d6d6
| 78249 Capaccioni ||  ||  || August 4, 2002 || Campo Imperatore || CINEOS || — || align=right | 3.8 km || 
|-id=250 bgcolor=#d6d6d6
| 78250 ||  || — || August 5, 2002 || Palomar || NEAT || HYG || align=right | 5.9 km || 
|-id=251 bgcolor=#d6d6d6
| 78251 ||  || — || August 5, 2002 || Palomar || NEAT || HYG || align=right | 7.0 km || 
|-id=252 bgcolor=#d6d6d6
| 78252 Priscio ||  ||  || August 5, 2002 || Campo Imperatore || CINEOS || — || align=right | 4.0 km || 
|-id=253 bgcolor=#d6d6d6
| 78253 ||  || — || August 5, 2002 || Palomar || NEAT || — || align=right | 4.7 km || 
|-id=254 bgcolor=#E9E9E9
| 78254 ||  || — || August 6, 2002 || Palomar || NEAT || — || align=right | 5.4 km || 
|-id=255 bgcolor=#E9E9E9
| 78255 ||  || — || August 6, 2002 || Palomar || NEAT || AGN || align=right | 2.6 km || 
|-id=256 bgcolor=#E9E9E9
| 78256 ||  || — || August 6, 2002 || Palomar || NEAT || — || align=right | 2.2 km || 
|-id=257 bgcolor=#E9E9E9
| 78257 ||  || — || August 6, 2002 || Palomar || NEAT || — || align=right | 4.0 km || 
|-id=258 bgcolor=#d6d6d6
| 78258 ||  || — || August 6, 2002 || Palomar || NEAT || KOR || align=right | 2.6 km || 
|-id=259 bgcolor=#d6d6d6
| 78259 ||  || — || August 6, 2002 || Palomar || NEAT || — || align=right | 4.7 km || 
|-id=260 bgcolor=#E9E9E9
| 78260 ||  || — || August 6, 2002 || Palomar || NEAT || — || align=right | 2.6 km || 
|-id=261 bgcolor=#d6d6d6
| 78261 ||  || — || August 6, 2002 || Palomar || NEAT || — || align=right | 6.6 km || 
|-id=262 bgcolor=#E9E9E9
| 78262 ||  || — || August 6, 2002 || Palomar || NEAT || — || align=right | 4.1 km || 
|-id=263 bgcolor=#E9E9E9
| 78263 ||  || — || August 6, 2002 || Palomar || NEAT || — || align=right | 4.4 km || 
|-id=264 bgcolor=#fefefe
| 78264 ||  || — || August 6, 2002 || Palomar || NEAT || — || align=right | 2.0 km || 
|-id=265 bgcolor=#E9E9E9
| 78265 ||  || — || August 6, 2002 || Palomar || NEAT || — || align=right | 5.9 km || 
|-id=266 bgcolor=#fefefe
| 78266 ||  || — || August 6, 2002 || Palomar || NEAT || FLO || align=right | 1.6 km || 
|-id=267 bgcolor=#d6d6d6
| 78267 ||  || — || August 6, 2002 || Palomar || NEAT || — || align=right | 5.9 km || 
|-id=268 bgcolor=#d6d6d6
| 78268 ||  || — || August 6, 2002 || Palomar || NEAT || EOS || align=right | 3.5 km || 
|-id=269 bgcolor=#E9E9E9
| 78269 ||  || — || August 6, 2002 || Palomar || NEAT || — || align=right | 3.7 km || 
|-id=270 bgcolor=#E9E9E9
| 78270 ||  || — || August 6, 2002 || Palomar || NEAT || — || align=right | 4.2 km || 
|-id=271 bgcolor=#E9E9E9
| 78271 ||  || — || August 6, 2002 || Palomar || NEAT || — || align=right | 3.8 km || 
|-id=272 bgcolor=#E9E9E9
| 78272 ||  || — || August 6, 2002 || Palomar || NEAT || — || align=right | 1.7 km || 
|-id=273 bgcolor=#fefefe
| 78273 ||  || — || August 6, 2002 || Palomar || NEAT || — || align=right | 1.5 km || 
|-id=274 bgcolor=#E9E9E9
| 78274 ||  || — || August 6, 2002 || Palomar || NEAT || — || align=right | 2.8 km || 
|-id=275 bgcolor=#d6d6d6
| 78275 ||  || — || August 6, 2002 || Palomar || NEAT || — || align=right | 7.0 km || 
|-id=276 bgcolor=#d6d6d6
| 78276 ||  || — || August 6, 2002 || Palomar || NEAT || KOR || align=right | 3.7 km || 
|-id=277 bgcolor=#d6d6d6
| 78277 ||  || — || August 6, 2002 || Palomar || NEAT || — || align=right | 3.7 km || 
|-id=278 bgcolor=#d6d6d6
| 78278 ||  || — || August 6, 2002 || Palomar || NEAT || HYG || align=right | 5.4 km || 
|-id=279 bgcolor=#E9E9E9
| 78279 ||  || — || August 6, 2002 || Palomar || NEAT || HEN || align=right | 2.0 km || 
|-id=280 bgcolor=#fefefe
| 78280 ||  || — || August 7, 2002 || Palomar || NEAT || MAS || align=right | 1.5 km || 
|-id=281 bgcolor=#d6d6d6
| 78281 ||  || — || August 7, 2002 || Palomar || NEAT || THM || align=right | 3.2 km || 
|-id=282 bgcolor=#d6d6d6
| 78282 ||  || — || August 10, 2002 || Reedy Creek || J. Broughton || KOR || align=right | 3.2 km || 
|-id=283 bgcolor=#d6d6d6
| 78283 ||  || — || August 5, 2002 || Socorro || LINEAR || — || align=right | 10 km || 
|-id=284 bgcolor=#E9E9E9
| 78284 ||  || — || August 11, 2002 || Emerald Lane || L. Ball || — || align=right | 4.8 km || 
|-id=285 bgcolor=#E9E9E9
| 78285 ||  || — || August 9, 2002 || Socorro || LINEAR || RAF || align=right | 3.2 km || 
|-id=286 bgcolor=#d6d6d6
| 78286 ||  || — || August 9, 2002 || Socorro || LINEAR || — || align=right | 6.2 km || 
|-id=287 bgcolor=#E9E9E9
| 78287 ||  || — || August 10, 2002 || Socorro || LINEAR || EUN || align=right | 3.1 km || 
|-id=288 bgcolor=#E9E9E9
| 78288 ||  || — || August 10, 2002 || Socorro || LINEAR || MRX || align=right | 3.4 km || 
|-id=289 bgcolor=#E9E9E9
| 78289 ||  || — || August 10, 2002 || Socorro || LINEAR || HNA || align=right | 5.0 km || 
|-id=290 bgcolor=#fefefe
| 78290 ||  || — || August 10, 2002 || Socorro || LINEAR || — || align=right | 1.7 km || 
|-id=291 bgcolor=#d6d6d6
| 78291 ||  || — || August 8, 2002 || Palomar || NEAT || — || align=right | 3.4 km || 
|-id=292 bgcolor=#d6d6d6
| 78292 ||  || — || August 8, 2002 || Palomar || NEAT || — || align=right | 7.7 km || 
|-id=293 bgcolor=#fefefe
| 78293 ||  || — || August 8, 2002 || Palomar || NEAT || — || align=right | 1.7 km || 
|-id=294 bgcolor=#E9E9E9
| 78294 ||  || — || August 8, 2002 || Palomar || NEAT || — || align=right | 4.8 km || 
|-id=295 bgcolor=#E9E9E9
| 78295 ||  || — || August 8, 2002 || Palomar || NEAT || — || align=right | 5.1 km || 
|-id=296 bgcolor=#d6d6d6
| 78296 ||  || — || August 8, 2002 || Palomar || NEAT || EOS || align=right | 4.7 km || 
|-id=297 bgcolor=#E9E9E9
| 78297 ||  || — || August 11, 2002 || Needville || Needville Obs. || EUN || align=right | 2.3 km || 
|-id=298 bgcolor=#fefefe
| 78298 ||  || — || August 5, 2002 || Socorro || LINEAR || NYS || align=right | 1.6 km || 
|-id=299 bgcolor=#E9E9E9
| 78299 ||  || — || August 9, 2002 || Socorro || LINEAR || — || align=right | 7.1 km || 
|-id=300 bgcolor=#d6d6d6
| 78300 ||  || — || August 9, 2002 || Socorro || LINEAR || ALA || align=right | 9.5 km || 
|}

78301–78400 

|-bgcolor=#d6d6d6
| 78301 ||  || — || August 9, 2002 || Socorro || LINEAR || HYG || align=right | 8.0 km || 
|-id=302 bgcolor=#E9E9E9
| 78302 ||  || — || August 9, 2002 || Socorro || LINEAR || — || align=right | 2.7 km || 
|-id=303 bgcolor=#E9E9E9
| 78303 ||  || — || August 9, 2002 || Socorro || LINEAR || — || align=right | 2.7 km || 
|-id=304 bgcolor=#E9E9E9
| 78304 ||  || — || August 10, 2002 || Socorro || LINEAR || GEF || align=right | 3.5 km || 
|-id=305 bgcolor=#d6d6d6
| 78305 ||  || — || August 10, 2002 || Socorro || LINEAR || — || align=right | 6.8 km || 
|-id=306 bgcolor=#d6d6d6
| 78306 ||  || — || August 8, 2002 || Palomar || NEAT || — || align=right | 6.6 km || 
|-id=307 bgcolor=#fefefe
| 78307 ||  || — || August 12, 2002 || Reedy Creek || J. Broughton || V || align=right | 1.4 km || 
|-id=308 bgcolor=#E9E9E9
| 78308 ||  || — || August 3, 2002 || Palomar || NEAT || — || align=right | 3.9 km || 
|-id=309 bgcolor=#E9E9E9
| 78309 Alessielisa ||  ||  || August 5, 2002 || Campo Imperatore || F. Bernardi || — || align=right | 2.1 km || 
|-id=310 bgcolor=#fefefe
| 78310 Spoto ||  ||  || August 5, 2002 || Campo Imperatore || CINEOS || V || align=right | 1.3 km || 
|-id=311 bgcolor=#E9E9E9
| 78311 ||  || — || August 6, 2002 || Palomar || NEAT || AER || align=right | 2.3 km || 
|-id=312 bgcolor=#d6d6d6
| 78312 ||  || — || August 6, 2002 || Palomar || NEAT || — || align=right | 6.3 km || 
|-id=313 bgcolor=#d6d6d6
| 78313 ||  || — || August 11, 2002 || Socorro || LINEAR || NAE || align=right | 7.2 km || 
|-id=314 bgcolor=#d6d6d6
| 78314 ||  || — || August 12, 2002 || Socorro || LINEAR || — || align=right | 5.7 km || 
|-id=315 bgcolor=#E9E9E9
| 78315 ||  || — || August 12, 2002 || Socorro || LINEAR || — || align=right | 3.5 km || 
|-id=316 bgcolor=#d6d6d6
| 78316 ||  || — || August 12, 2002 || Socorro || LINEAR || — || align=right | 5.6 km || 
|-id=317 bgcolor=#d6d6d6
| 78317 ||  || — || August 12, 2002 || Socorro || LINEAR || — || align=right | 7.4 km || 
|-id=318 bgcolor=#d6d6d6
| 78318 ||  || — || August 12, 2002 || Socorro || LINEAR || — || align=right | 8.3 km || 
|-id=319 bgcolor=#d6d6d6
| 78319 ||  || — || August 8, 2002 || Palomar || NEAT || — || align=right | 5.3 km || 
|-id=320 bgcolor=#E9E9E9
| 78320 ||  || — || August 11, 2002 || Haleakala || NEAT || — || align=right | 3.1 km || 
|-id=321 bgcolor=#fefefe
| 78321 ||  || — || August 11, 2002 || Palomar || NEAT || — || align=right | 2.5 km || 
|-id=322 bgcolor=#d6d6d6
| 78322 ||  || — || August 11, 2002 || Palomar || NEAT || EOS || align=right | 3.9 km || 
|-id=323 bgcolor=#d6d6d6
| 78323 ||  || — || August 11, 2002 || Palomar || NEAT || HYG || align=right | 6.5 km || 
|-id=324 bgcolor=#fefefe
| 78324 ||  || — || August 9, 2002 || Socorro || LINEAR || NYS || align=right | 1.9 km || 
|-id=325 bgcolor=#E9E9E9
| 78325 ||  || — || August 9, 2002 || Socorro || LINEAR || — || align=right | 5.0 km || 
|-id=326 bgcolor=#E9E9E9
| 78326 ||  || — || August 10, 2002 || Socorro || LINEAR || — || align=right | 3.3 km || 
|-id=327 bgcolor=#d6d6d6
| 78327 ||  || — || August 10, 2002 || Socorro || LINEAR || — || align=right | 5.0 km || 
|-id=328 bgcolor=#d6d6d6
| 78328 ||  || — || August 10, 2002 || Socorro || LINEAR || — || align=right | 7.2 km || 
|-id=329 bgcolor=#E9E9E9
| 78329 ||  || — || August 10, 2002 || Socorro || LINEAR || — || align=right | 3.5 km || 
|-id=330 bgcolor=#d6d6d6
| 78330 ||  || — || August 10, 2002 || Socorro || LINEAR || — || align=right | 5.4 km || 
|-id=331 bgcolor=#E9E9E9
| 78331 ||  || — || August 10, 2002 || Socorro || LINEAR || — || align=right | 5.4 km || 
|-id=332 bgcolor=#E9E9E9
| 78332 ||  || — || August 10, 2002 || Socorro || LINEAR || — || align=right | 6.5 km || 
|-id=333 bgcolor=#E9E9E9
| 78333 ||  || — || August 12, 2002 || Socorro || LINEAR || — || align=right | 3.2 km || 
|-id=334 bgcolor=#d6d6d6
| 78334 ||  || — || August 12, 2002 || Socorro || LINEAR || — || align=right | 6.1 km || 
|-id=335 bgcolor=#fefefe
| 78335 ||  || — || August 13, 2002 || El Centro || W. K. Y. Yeung || — || align=right | 2.0 km || 
|-id=336 bgcolor=#E9E9E9
| 78336 ||  || — || August 12, 2002 || Socorro || LINEAR || GEF || align=right | 2.4 km || 
|-id=337 bgcolor=#d6d6d6
| 78337 ||  || — || August 12, 2002 || Socorro || LINEAR || — || align=right | 6.2 km || 
|-id=338 bgcolor=#E9E9E9
| 78338 ||  || — || August 13, 2002 || Kitt Peak || Spacewatch || — || align=right | 2.2 km || 
|-id=339 bgcolor=#E9E9E9
| 78339 ||  || — || August 13, 2002 || Kitt Peak || Spacewatch || — || align=right | 3.6 km || 
|-id=340 bgcolor=#d6d6d6
| 78340 ||  || — || August 11, 2002 || Socorro || LINEAR || URS || align=right | 5.8 km || 
|-id=341 bgcolor=#E9E9E9
| 78341 ||  || — || August 11, 2002 || Socorro || LINEAR || MAR || align=right | 2.9 km || 
|-id=342 bgcolor=#d6d6d6
| 78342 ||  || — || August 14, 2002 || Socorro || LINEAR || — || align=right | 5.2 km || 
|-id=343 bgcolor=#E9E9E9
| 78343 ||  || — || August 14, 2002 || Palomar || NEAT || — || align=right | 2.1 km || 
|-id=344 bgcolor=#d6d6d6
| 78344 ||  || — || August 14, 2002 || Palomar || NEAT || — || align=right | 9.0 km || 
|-id=345 bgcolor=#d6d6d6
| 78345 ||  || — || August 11, 2002 || Haleakala || NEAT || — || align=right | 8.1 km || 
|-id=346 bgcolor=#d6d6d6
| 78346 ||  || — || August 11, 2002 || Haleakala || NEAT || HYG || align=right | 4.4 km || 
|-id=347 bgcolor=#d6d6d6
| 78347 ||  || — || August 12, 2002 || Socorro || LINEAR || EOS || align=right | 4.1 km || 
|-id=348 bgcolor=#d6d6d6
| 78348 ||  || — || August 12, 2002 || Haleakala || NEAT || EOS || align=right | 4.9 km || 
|-id=349 bgcolor=#d6d6d6
| 78349 ||  || — || August 14, 2002 || Socorro || LINEAR || HYG || align=right | 5.3 km || 
|-id=350 bgcolor=#d6d6d6
| 78350 ||  || — || August 14, 2002 || Socorro || LINEAR || HYG || align=right | 7.8 km || 
|-id=351 bgcolor=#E9E9E9
| 78351 ||  || — || August 14, 2002 || Socorro || LINEAR || — || align=right | 3.0 km || 
|-id=352 bgcolor=#d6d6d6
| 78352 ||  || — || August 14, 2002 || Socorro || LINEAR || — || align=right | 5.0 km || 
|-id=353 bgcolor=#fefefe
| 78353 ||  || — || August 14, 2002 || Socorro || LINEAR || — || align=right | 2.1 km || 
|-id=354 bgcolor=#d6d6d6
| 78354 ||  || — || August 12, 2002 || Socorro || LINEAR || — || align=right | 6.0 km || 
|-id=355 bgcolor=#E9E9E9
| 78355 ||  || — || August 12, 2002 || Socorro || LINEAR || — || align=right | 2.0 km || 
|-id=356 bgcolor=#d6d6d6
| 78356 ||  || — || August 12, 2002 || Socorro || LINEAR || — || align=right | 6.3 km || 
|-id=357 bgcolor=#d6d6d6
| 78357 ||  || — || August 12, 2002 || Socorro || LINEAR || — || align=right | 4.4 km || 
|-id=358 bgcolor=#fefefe
| 78358 ||  || — || August 13, 2002 || Socorro || LINEAR || — || align=right | 1.6 km || 
|-id=359 bgcolor=#d6d6d6
| 78359 ||  || — || August 13, 2002 || Socorro || LINEAR || EOS || align=right | 4.6 km || 
|-id=360 bgcolor=#E9E9E9
| 78360 ||  || — || August 13, 2002 || Socorro || LINEAR || — || align=right | 2.1 km || 
|-id=361 bgcolor=#fefefe
| 78361 ||  || — || August 13, 2002 || Socorro || LINEAR || V || align=right | 1.5 km || 
|-id=362 bgcolor=#d6d6d6
| 78362 ||  || — || August 13, 2002 || Socorro || LINEAR || — || align=right | 8.6 km || 
|-id=363 bgcolor=#d6d6d6
| 78363 ||  || — || August 14, 2002 || Socorro || LINEAR || HYG || align=right | 4.6 km || 
|-id=364 bgcolor=#d6d6d6
| 78364 ||  || — || August 12, 2002 || Socorro || LINEAR || HYG || align=right | 7.5 km || 
|-id=365 bgcolor=#E9E9E9
| 78365 ||  || — || August 13, 2002 || Socorro || LINEAR || — || align=right | 5.2 km || 
|-id=366 bgcolor=#d6d6d6
| 78366 ||  || — || August 14, 2002 || Anderson Mesa || LONEOS || — || align=right | 5.6 km || 
|-id=367 bgcolor=#E9E9E9
| 78367 ||  || — || August 15, 2002 || Palomar || NEAT || GEF || align=right | 3.3 km || 
|-id=368 bgcolor=#E9E9E9
| 78368 ||  || — || August 13, 2002 || Anderson Mesa || LONEOS || PAD || align=right | 4.2 km || 
|-id=369 bgcolor=#E9E9E9
| 78369 ||  || — || August 13, 2002 || Anderson Mesa || LONEOS || PAD || align=right | 4.2 km || 
|-id=370 bgcolor=#E9E9E9
| 78370 ||  || — || August 13, 2002 || Anderson Mesa || LONEOS || PAD || align=right | 4.6 km || 
|-id=371 bgcolor=#d6d6d6
| 78371 ||  || — || August 13, 2002 || Anderson Mesa || LONEOS || — || align=right | 7.9 km || 
|-id=372 bgcolor=#d6d6d6
| 78372 ||  || — || August 14, 2002 || Socorro || LINEAR || KOR || align=right | 3.0 km || 
|-id=373 bgcolor=#E9E9E9
| 78373 ||  || — || August 14, 2002 || Socorro || LINEAR || — || align=right | 1.9 km || 
|-id=374 bgcolor=#fefefe
| 78374 ||  || — || August 14, 2002 || Socorro || LINEAR || — || align=right | 1.4 km || 
|-id=375 bgcolor=#E9E9E9
| 78375 ||  || — || August 14, 2002 || Socorro || LINEAR || — || align=right | 2.3 km || 
|-id=376 bgcolor=#d6d6d6
| 78376 ||  || — || August 14, 2002 || Socorro || LINEAR || — || align=right | 6.5 km || 
|-id=377 bgcolor=#E9E9E9
| 78377 ||  || — || August 14, 2002 || Socorro || LINEAR || — || align=right | 3.0 km || 
|-id=378 bgcolor=#d6d6d6
| 78378 ||  || — || August 14, 2002 || Socorro || LINEAR || KOR || align=right | 3.4 km || 
|-id=379 bgcolor=#d6d6d6
| 78379 ||  || — || August 14, 2002 || Socorro || LINEAR || KOR || align=right | 3.2 km || 
|-id=380 bgcolor=#d6d6d6
| 78380 ||  || — || August 14, 2002 || Socorro || LINEAR || — || align=right | 4.8 km || 
|-id=381 bgcolor=#E9E9E9
| 78381 ||  || — || August 14, 2002 || Socorro || LINEAR || — || align=right | 4.6 km || 
|-id=382 bgcolor=#E9E9E9
| 78382 ||  || — || August 14, 2002 || Socorro || LINEAR || AGN || align=right | 3.2 km || 
|-id=383 bgcolor=#E9E9E9
| 78383 Philmassey ||  ||  || August 15, 2002 || Anderson Mesa || LONEOS || PAD || align=right | 3.1 km || 
|-id=384 bgcolor=#d6d6d6
| 78384 ||  || — || August 12, 2002 || Socorro || LINEAR || — || align=right | 6.3 km || 
|-id=385 bgcolor=#d6d6d6
| 78385 ||  || — || August 14, 2002 || Socorro || LINEAR || — || align=right | 9.1 km || 
|-id=386 bgcolor=#E9E9E9
| 78386 Deuzelur ||  ||  || August 8, 2002 || Palomar || S. F. Hönig || — || align=right | 3.4 km || 
|-id=387 bgcolor=#E9E9E9
| 78387 ||  || — || August 8, 2002 || Palomar || S. F. Hönig || NEM || align=right | 3.9 km || 
|-id=388 bgcolor=#d6d6d6
| 78388 ||  || — || August 8, 2002 || Palomar || S. F. Hönig || — || align=right | 4.4 km || 
|-id=389 bgcolor=#d6d6d6
| 78389 ||  || — || August 8, 2002 || Palomar || S. F. Hönig || HYG || align=right | 5.5 km || 
|-id=390 bgcolor=#d6d6d6
| 78390 ||  || — || August 8, 2002 || Palomar || S. F. Hönig || — || align=right | 4.7 km || 
|-id=391 bgcolor=#d6d6d6
| 78391 Michaeljäger ||  ||  || August 8, 2002 || Palomar || S. F. Hönig || — || align=right | 3.6 km || 
|-id=392 bgcolor=#E9E9E9
| 78392 Dellinger ||  ||  || August 9, 2002 || Haleakala || A. Lowe || — || align=right | 3.0 km || 
|-id=393 bgcolor=#E9E9E9
| 78393 Dillon ||  ||  || August 8, 2002 || Palomar || A. Lowe || — || align=right | 2.9 km || 
|-id=394 bgcolor=#fefefe
| 78394 Garossino ||  ||  || August 9, 2002 || Haleakala || A. Lowe || SUL || align=right | 4.1 km || 
|-id=395 bgcolor=#d6d6d6
| 78395 ||  || — || August 16, 2002 || Socorro || LINEAR || — || align=right | 7.8 km || 
|-id=396 bgcolor=#d6d6d6
| 78396 ||  || — || August 16, 2002 || Haleakala || NEAT || — || align=right | 5.7 km || 
|-id=397 bgcolor=#E9E9E9
| 78397 ||  || — || August 16, 2002 || Palomar || NEAT || HOF || align=right | 6.4 km || 
|-id=398 bgcolor=#d6d6d6
| 78398 ||  || — || August 16, 2002 || Palomar || NEAT || — || align=right | 5.8 km || 
|-id=399 bgcolor=#E9E9E9
| 78399 ||  || — || August 16, 2002 || Haleakala || NEAT || MRX || align=right | 2.7 km || 
|-id=400 bgcolor=#d6d6d6
| 78400 ||  || — || August 16, 2002 || Palomar || NEAT || — || align=right | 7.7 km || 
|}

78401–78500 

|-bgcolor=#d6d6d6
| 78401 ||  || — || August 19, 2002 || Palomar || NEAT || — || align=right | 7.3 km || 
|-id=402 bgcolor=#d6d6d6
| 78402 ||  || — || August 19, 2002 || Haleakala || NEAT || — || align=right | 6.1 km || 
|-id=403 bgcolor=#d6d6d6
| 78403 ||  || — || August 19, 2002 || Palomar || NEAT || EOS || align=right | 4.1 km || 
|-id=404 bgcolor=#d6d6d6
| 78404 ||  || — || August 26, 2002 || Palomar || NEAT || — || align=right | 4.0 km || 
|-id=405 bgcolor=#d6d6d6
| 78405 ||  || — || August 26, 2002 || Palomar || NEAT || — || align=right | 8.7 km || 
|-id=406 bgcolor=#d6d6d6
| 78406 ||  || — || August 27, 2002 || Palomar || NEAT || — || align=right | 4.1 km || 
|-id=407 bgcolor=#d6d6d6
| 78407 ||  || — || August 28, 2002 || Palomar || NEAT || — || align=right | 4.2 km || 
|-id=408 bgcolor=#E9E9E9
| 78408 ||  || — || August 26, 2002 || Palomar || NEAT || HOF || align=right | 6.0 km || 
|-id=409 bgcolor=#E9E9E9
| 78409 ||  || — || August 27, 2002 || Palomar || NEAT || GEF || align=right | 2.5 km || 
|-id=410 bgcolor=#fefefe
| 78410 ||  || — || August 26, 2002 || Palomar || NEAT || — || align=right | 1.2 km || 
|-id=411 bgcolor=#fefefe
| 78411 ||  || — || August 28, 2002 || Palomar || NEAT || — || align=right | 1.4 km || 
|-id=412 bgcolor=#d6d6d6
| 78412 ||  || — || August 29, 2002 || Palomar || NEAT || CHA || align=right | 4.8 km || 
|-id=413 bgcolor=#fefefe
| 78413 ||  || — || August 29, 2002 || Palomar || NEAT || — || align=right | 1.5 km || 
|-id=414 bgcolor=#E9E9E9
| 78414 ||  || — || August 29, 2002 || Palomar || NEAT || — || align=right | 2.0 km || 
|-id=415 bgcolor=#E9E9E9
| 78415 ||  || — || August 29, 2002 || Palomar || NEAT || — || align=right | 3.7 km || 
|-id=416 bgcolor=#fefefe
| 78416 ||  || — || August 29, 2002 || Palomar || NEAT || — || align=right | 1.8 km || 
|-id=417 bgcolor=#fefefe
| 78417 ||  || — || August 30, 2002 || Kitt Peak || Spacewatch || MAS || align=right | 1.1 km || 
|-id=418 bgcolor=#d6d6d6
| 78418 ||  || — || August 30, 2002 || Kitt Peak || Spacewatch || THM || align=right | 6.5 km || 
|-id=419 bgcolor=#d6d6d6
| 78419 ||  || — || August 27, 2002 || Palomar || NEAT || 7:4 || align=right | 5.2 km || 
|-id=420 bgcolor=#d6d6d6
| 78420 ||  || — || August 29, 2002 || Palomar || NEAT || — || align=right | 5.8 km || 
|-id=421 bgcolor=#d6d6d6
| 78421 ||  || — || August 29, 2002 || Palomar || NEAT || — || align=right | 6.5 km || 
|-id=422 bgcolor=#d6d6d6
| 78422 ||  || — || August 29, 2002 || Palomar || NEAT || — || align=right | 4.7 km || 
|-id=423 bgcolor=#d6d6d6
| 78423 ||  || — || August 29, 2002 || Palomar || NEAT || THM || align=right | 5.6 km || 
|-id=424 bgcolor=#E9E9E9
| 78424 ||  || — || August 29, 2002 || Palomar || NEAT || — || align=right | 4.5 km || 
|-id=425 bgcolor=#E9E9E9
| 78425 ||  || — || August 30, 2002 || Palomar || NEAT || — || align=right | 4.3 km || 
|-id=426 bgcolor=#fefefe
| 78426 ||  || — || August 30, 2002 || Ametlla de Mar || Ametlla de Mar Obs. || NYS || align=right | 1.6 km || 
|-id=427 bgcolor=#fefefe
| 78427 ||  || — || August 29, 2002 || Kitt Peak || Spacewatch || — || align=right | 2.0 km || 
|-id=428 bgcolor=#d6d6d6
| 78428 ||  || — || August 29, 2002 || Palomar || NEAT || — || align=right | 6.2 km || 
|-id=429 bgcolor=#d6d6d6
| 78429 Baschek ||  ||  || August 18, 2002 || Palomar || S. F. Hönig || EOS || align=right | 3.2 km || 
|-id=430 bgcolor=#E9E9E9
| 78430 Andrewpearce ||  ||  || August 18, 2002 || Palomar || S. F. Hönig || HEN || align=right | 1.9 km || 
|-id=431 bgcolor=#fefefe
| 78431 Kemble ||  ||  || August 16, 2002 || Palomar || A. Lowe || — || align=right | 1.3 km || 
|-id=432 bgcolor=#d6d6d6
| 78432 Helensailer ||  ||  || August 29, 2002 || Palomar || R. Matson || — || align=right | 5.2 km || 
|-id=433 bgcolor=#E9E9E9
| 78433 Gertrudolf ||  ||  || August 29, 2002 || Palomar || S. F. Hönig || HEN || align=right | 2.0 km || 
|-id=434 bgcolor=#E9E9E9
| 78434 Dyer ||  ||  || August 17, 2002 || Palomar || A. Lowe || HOF || align=right | 4.6 km || 
|-id=435 bgcolor=#d6d6d6
| 78435 ||  || — || September 4, 2002 || Anderson Mesa || LONEOS || — || align=right | 5.8 km || 
|-id=436 bgcolor=#d6d6d6
| 78436 ||  || — || September 3, 2002 || Palomar || NEAT || — || align=right | 7.9 km || 
|-id=437 bgcolor=#d6d6d6
| 78437 ||  || — || September 3, 2002 || Palomar || NEAT || — || align=right | 5.9 km || 
|-id=438 bgcolor=#E9E9E9
| 78438 ||  || — || September 1, 2002 || Haleakala || NEAT || GEF || align=right | 2.9 km || 
|-id=439 bgcolor=#fefefe
| 78439 ||  || — || September 3, 2002 || Haleakala || NEAT || MAS || align=right | 1.6 km || 
|-id=440 bgcolor=#d6d6d6
| 78440 ||  || — || September 4, 2002 || Anderson Mesa || LONEOS || THM || align=right | 6.9 km || 
|-id=441 bgcolor=#fefefe
| 78441 ||  || — || September 4, 2002 || Anderson Mesa || LONEOS || NYS || align=right | 1.1 km || 
|-id=442 bgcolor=#d6d6d6
| 78442 ||  || — || September 4, 2002 || Anderson Mesa || LONEOS || — || align=right | 5.8 km || 
|-id=443 bgcolor=#d6d6d6
| 78443 ||  || — || September 4, 2002 || Anderson Mesa || LONEOS || — || align=right | 5.1 km || 
|-id=444 bgcolor=#d6d6d6
| 78444 ||  || — || September 4, 2002 || Anderson Mesa || LONEOS || HYG || align=right | 6.4 km || 
|-id=445 bgcolor=#E9E9E9
| 78445 ||  || — || September 4, 2002 || Anderson Mesa || LONEOS || — || align=right | 6.7 km || 
|-id=446 bgcolor=#d6d6d6
| 78446 ||  || — || September 4, 2002 || Anderson Mesa || LONEOS || — || align=right | 5.4 km || 
|-id=447 bgcolor=#d6d6d6
| 78447 ||  || — || September 4, 2002 || Anderson Mesa || LONEOS || KOR || align=right | 3.6 km || 
|-id=448 bgcolor=#E9E9E9
| 78448 ||  || — || September 4, 2002 || Anderson Mesa || LONEOS || — || align=right | 4.8 km || 
|-id=449 bgcolor=#E9E9E9
| 78449 ||  || — || September 4, 2002 || Anderson Mesa || LONEOS || — || align=right | 3.1 km || 
|-id=450 bgcolor=#E9E9E9
| 78450 ||  || — || September 4, 2002 || Anderson Mesa || LONEOS || — || align=right | 2.2 km || 
|-id=451 bgcolor=#E9E9E9
| 78451 ||  || — || September 4, 2002 || Anderson Mesa || LONEOS || — || align=right | 3.7 km || 
|-id=452 bgcolor=#d6d6d6
| 78452 ||  || — || September 4, 2002 || Anderson Mesa || LONEOS || — || align=right | 12 km || 
|-id=453 bgcolor=#d6d6d6
| 78453 Bullock ||  ||  || September 3, 2002 || Campo Imperatore || F. Bernardi || HYG || align=right | 6.1 km || 
|-id=454 bgcolor=#E9E9E9
| 78454 ||  || — || September 3, 2002 || Haleakala || NEAT || — || align=right | 3.4 km || 
|-id=455 bgcolor=#d6d6d6
| 78455 ||  || — || September 3, 2002 || Haleakala || NEAT || EUP || align=right | 8.2 km || 
|-id=456 bgcolor=#E9E9E9
| 78456 ||  || — || September 4, 2002 || Anderson Mesa || LONEOS || — || align=right | 2.0 km || 
|-id=457 bgcolor=#E9E9E9
| 78457 ||  || — || September 4, 2002 || Anderson Mesa || LONEOS || — || align=right | 3.3 km || 
|-id=458 bgcolor=#E9E9E9
| 78458 ||  || — || September 4, 2002 || Anderson Mesa || LONEOS || — || align=right | 4.0 km || 
|-id=459 bgcolor=#E9E9E9
| 78459 ||  || — || September 5, 2002 || Anderson Mesa || LONEOS || — || align=right | 3.6 km || 
|-id=460 bgcolor=#E9E9E9
| 78460 ||  || — || September 5, 2002 || Anderson Mesa || LONEOS || — || align=right | 5.1 km || 
|-id=461 bgcolor=#E9E9E9
| 78461 ||  || — || September 5, 2002 || Socorro || LINEAR || — || align=right | 3.4 km || 
|-id=462 bgcolor=#E9E9E9
| 78462 ||  || — || September 5, 2002 || Anderson Mesa || LONEOS || — || align=right | 2.5 km || 
|-id=463 bgcolor=#E9E9E9
| 78463 ||  || — || September 5, 2002 || Socorro || LINEAR || — || align=right | 1.5 km || 
|-id=464 bgcolor=#E9E9E9
| 78464 ||  || — || September 5, 2002 || Socorro || LINEAR || — || align=right | 2.8 km || 
|-id=465 bgcolor=#E9E9E9
| 78465 ||  || — || September 5, 2002 || Socorro || LINEAR || — || align=right | 3.2 km || 
|-id=466 bgcolor=#d6d6d6
| 78466 ||  || — || September 5, 2002 || Socorro || LINEAR || THM || align=right | 6.2 km || 
|-id=467 bgcolor=#E9E9E9
| 78467 ||  || — || September 5, 2002 || Socorro || LINEAR || — || align=right | 3.6 km || 
|-id=468 bgcolor=#d6d6d6
| 78468 ||  || — || September 5, 2002 || Socorro || LINEAR || — || align=right | 5.5 km || 
|-id=469 bgcolor=#E9E9E9
| 78469 ||  || — || September 5, 2002 || Socorro || LINEAR || — || align=right | 4.1 km || 
|-id=470 bgcolor=#d6d6d6
| 78470 ||  || — || September 5, 2002 || Socorro || LINEAR || 3:2 || align=right | 11 km || 
|-id=471 bgcolor=#E9E9E9
| 78471 ||  || — || September 5, 2002 || Socorro || LINEAR || — || align=right | 4.9 km || 
|-id=472 bgcolor=#E9E9E9
| 78472 ||  || — || September 5, 2002 || Socorro || LINEAR || — || align=right | 3.5 km || 
|-id=473 bgcolor=#d6d6d6
| 78473 ||  || — || September 5, 2002 || Socorro || LINEAR || KOR || align=right | 3.2 km || 
|-id=474 bgcolor=#fefefe
| 78474 ||  || — || September 5, 2002 || Socorro || LINEAR || — || align=right | 2.4 km || 
|-id=475 bgcolor=#fefefe
| 78475 ||  || — || September 5, 2002 || Socorro || LINEAR || FLO || align=right | 1.5 km || 
|-id=476 bgcolor=#d6d6d6
| 78476 ||  || — || September 5, 2002 || Socorro || LINEAR || — || align=right | 8.4 km || 
|-id=477 bgcolor=#d6d6d6
| 78477 ||  || — || September 5, 2002 || Socorro || LINEAR || HIL3:2 || align=right | 7.6 km || 
|-id=478 bgcolor=#d6d6d6
| 78478 ||  || — || September 5, 2002 || Socorro || LINEAR || TIR || align=right | 4.3 km || 
|-id=479 bgcolor=#d6d6d6
| 78479 ||  || — || September 5, 2002 || Socorro || LINEAR || KOR || align=right | 3.5 km || 
|-id=480 bgcolor=#d6d6d6
| 78480 ||  || — || September 5, 2002 || Socorro || LINEAR || — || align=right | 5.1 km || 
|-id=481 bgcolor=#d6d6d6
| 78481 ||  || — || September 5, 2002 || Socorro || LINEAR || — || align=right | 5.9 km || 
|-id=482 bgcolor=#d6d6d6
| 78482 ||  || — || September 5, 2002 || Socorro || LINEAR || CHA || align=right | 4.6 km || 
|-id=483 bgcolor=#fefefe
| 78483 ||  || — || September 5, 2002 || Anderson Mesa || LONEOS || V || align=right | 1.3 km || 
|-id=484 bgcolor=#E9E9E9
| 78484 ||  || — || September 5, 2002 || Anderson Mesa || LONEOS || PAD || align=right | 4.4 km || 
|-id=485 bgcolor=#d6d6d6
| 78485 ||  || — || September 5, 2002 || Anderson Mesa || LONEOS || — || align=right | 5.6 km || 
|-id=486 bgcolor=#E9E9E9
| 78486 ||  || — || September 5, 2002 || Socorro || LINEAR || GEF || align=right | 3.7 km || 
|-id=487 bgcolor=#d6d6d6
| 78487 ||  || — || September 5, 2002 || Socorro || LINEAR || EOS || align=right | 3.6 km || 
|-id=488 bgcolor=#d6d6d6
| 78488 ||  || — || September 5, 2002 || Socorro || LINEAR || — || align=right | 7.3 km || 
|-id=489 bgcolor=#fefefe
| 78489 ||  || — || September 5, 2002 || Socorro || LINEAR || NYS || align=right | 1.3 km || 
|-id=490 bgcolor=#E9E9E9
| 78490 ||  || — || September 5, 2002 || Socorro || LINEAR || — || align=right | 4.3 km || 
|-id=491 bgcolor=#d6d6d6
| 78491 ||  || — || September 5, 2002 || Socorro || LINEAR || — || align=right | 7.5 km || 
|-id=492 bgcolor=#fefefe
| 78492 ||  || — || September 5, 2002 || Socorro || LINEAR || — || align=right | 6.2 km || 
|-id=493 bgcolor=#E9E9E9
| 78493 ||  || — || September 5, 2002 || Socorro || LINEAR || — || align=right | 3.6 km || 
|-id=494 bgcolor=#fefefe
| 78494 ||  || — || September 5, 2002 || Socorro || LINEAR || — || align=right | 1.3 km || 
|-id=495 bgcolor=#d6d6d6
| 78495 ||  || — || September 5, 2002 || Socorro || LINEAR || — || align=right | 7.4 km || 
|-id=496 bgcolor=#d6d6d6
| 78496 ||  || — || September 3, 2002 || Palomar || NEAT || — || align=right | 6.9 km || 
|-id=497 bgcolor=#E9E9E9
| 78497 ||  || — || September 5, 2002 || Socorro || LINEAR || — || align=right | 4.4 km || 
|-id=498 bgcolor=#d6d6d6
| 78498 ||  || — || September 5, 2002 || Socorro || LINEAR || THM || align=right | 4.3 km || 
|-id=499 bgcolor=#fefefe
| 78499 ||  || — || September 5, 2002 || Socorro || LINEAR || FLO || align=right | 1.5 km || 
|-id=500 bgcolor=#d6d6d6
| 78500 ||  || — || September 5, 2002 || Socorro || LINEAR || — || align=right | 4.0 km || 
|}

78501–78600 

|-bgcolor=#d6d6d6
| 78501 ||  || — || September 5, 2002 || Socorro || LINEAR || — || align=right | 5.7 km || 
|-id=502 bgcolor=#E9E9E9
| 78502 ||  || — || September 5, 2002 || Socorro || LINEAR || GEF || align=right | 3.3 km || 
|-id=503 bgcolor=#d6d6d6
| 78503 ||  || — || September 5, 2002 || Socorro || LINEAR || — || align=right | 4.6 km || 
|-id=504 bgcolor=#d6d6d6
| 78504 ||  || — || September 5, 2002 || Socorro || LINEAR || TIR || align=right | 3.6 km || 
|-id=505 bgcolor=#d6d6d6
| 78505 ||  || — || September 5, 2002 || Socorro || LINEAR || — || align=right | 5.5 km || 
|-id=506 bgcolor=#fefefe
| 78506 ||  || — || September 5, 2002 || Socorro || LINEAR || — || align=right | 1.7 km || 
|-id=507 bgcolor=#fefefe
| 78507 ||  || — || September 5, 2002 || Socorro || LINEAR || NYS || align=right | 1.4 km || 
|-id=508 bgcolor=#E9E9E9
| 78508 ||  || — || September 5, 2002 || Socorro || LINEAR || — || align=right | 1.8 km || 
|-id=509 bgcolor=#E9E9E9
| 78509 ||  || — || September 5, 2002 || Socorro || LINEAR || — || align=right | 3.1 km || 
|-id=510 bgcolor=#d6d6d6
| 78510 ||  || — || September 5, 2002 || Socorro || LINEAR || — || align=right | 7.8 km || 
|-id=511 bgcolor=#E9E9E9
| 78511 ||  || — || September 5, 2002 || Socorro || LINEAR || — || align=right | 4.9 km || 
|-id=512 bgcolor=#d6d6d6
| 78512 ||  || — || September 5, 2002 || Socorro || LINEAR || — || align=right | 5.1 km || 
|-id=513 bgcolor=#d6d6d6
| 78513 ||  || — || September 5, 2002 || Socorro || LINEAR || KOR || align=right | 3.7 km || 
|-id=514 bgcolor=#d6d6d6
| 78514 ||  || — || September 5, 2002 || Socorro || LINEAR || — || align=right | 5.4 km || 
|-id=515 bgcolor=#fefefe
| 78515 ||  || — || September 5, 2002 || Socorro || LINEAR || MAS || align=right | 1.5 km || 
|-id=516 bgcolor=#d6d6d6
| 78516 ||  || — || September 5, 2002 || Socorro || LINEAR || KOR || align=right | 3.1 km || 
|-id=517 bgcolor=#d6d6d6
| 78517 ||  || — || September 5, 2002 || Socorro || LINEAR || KOR || align=right | 3.4 km || 
|-id=518 bgcolor=#d6d6d6
| 78518 ||  || — || September 5, 2002 || Anderson Mesa || LONEOS || EOS || align=right | 5.4 km || 
|-id=519 bgcolor=#E9E9E9
| 78519 ||  || — || September 5, 2002 || Socorro || LINEAR || — || align=right | 1.9 km || 
|-id=520 bgcolor=#fefefe
| 78520 ||  || — || September 5, 2002 || Socorro || LINEAR || NYS || align=right | 1.7 km || 
|-id=521 bgcolor=#E9E9E9
| 78521 ||  || — || September 5, 2002 || Socorro || LINEAR || — || align=right | 5.5 km || 
|-id=522 bgcolor=#d6d6d6
| 78522 ||  || — || September 5, 2002 || Socorro || LINEAR || — || align=right | 4.8 km || 
|-id=523 bgcolor=#fefefe
| 78523 ||  || — || September 5, 2002 || Socorro || LINEAR || NYS || align=right | 1.3 km || 
|-id=524 bgcolor=#d6d6d6
| 78524 ||  || — || September 5, 2002 || Socorro || LINEAR || — || align=right | 7.2 km || 
|-id=525 bgcolor=#d6d6d6
| 78525 ||  || — || September 5, 2002 || Socorro || LINEAR || TEL || align=right | 3.1 km || 
|-id=526 bgcolor=#fefefe
| 78526 ||  || — || September 5, 2002 || Socorro || LINEAR || — || align=right | 2.0 km || 
|-id=527 bgcolor=#d6d6d6
| 78527 ||  || — || September 5, 2002 || Socorro || LINEAR || — || align=right | 5.7 km || 
|-id=528 bgcolor=#d6d6d6
| 78528 ||  || — || September 5, 2002 || Socorro || LINEAR || HYG || align=right | 6.1 km || 
|-id=529 bgcolor=#d6d6d6
| 78529 ||  || — || September 5, 2002 || Socorro || LINEAR || — || align=right | 8.2 km || 
|-id=530 bgcolor=#d6d6d6
| 78530 ||  || — || September 5, 2002 || Socorro || LINEAR || — || align=right | 4.3 km || 
|-id=531 bgcolor=#E9E9E9
| 78531 ||  || — || September 5, 2002 || Socorro || LINEAR || PAD || align=right | 5.0 km || 
|-id=532 bgcolor=#d6d6d6
| 78532 ||  || — || September 5, 2002 || Socorro || LINEAR || — || align=right | 6.4 km || 
|-id=533 bgcolor=#d6d6d6
| 78533 ||  || — || September 5, 2002 || Socorro || LINEAR || — || align=right | 5.8 km || 
|-id=534 bgcolor=#E9E9E9
| 78534 Renmir ||  ||  || September 6, 2002 || Campo Imperatore || CINEOS || — || align=right | 6.0 km || 
|-id=535 bgcolor=#E9E9E9
| 78535 Carloconti ||  ||  || September 6, 2002 || Campo Imperatore || CINEOS || MAR || align=right | 3.7 km || 
|-id=536 bgcolor=#d6d6d6
| 78536 Shrbený ||  ||  || September 7, 2002 || Ondřejov || P. Pravec, P. Kušnirák || — || align=right | 8.8 km || 
|-id=537 bgcolor=#E9E9E9
| 78537 ||  || — || September 5, 2002 || Socorro || LINEAR || HEN || align=right | 2.7 km || 
|-id=538 bgcolor=#E9E9E9
| 78538 ||  || — || September 7, 2002 || Socorro || LINEAR || — || align=right | 4.0 km || 
|-id=539 bgcolor=#E9E9E9
| 78539 ||  || — || September 7, 2002 || Socorro || LINEAR || — || align=right | 7.2 km || 
|-id=540 bgcolor=#d6d6d6
| 78540 ||  || — || September 7, 2002 || Ondřejov || P. Kušnirák, P. Pravec || THM || align=right | 4.1 km || 
|-id=541 bgcolor=#d6d6d6
| 78541 ||  || — || September 2, 2002 || Kvistaberg || UDAS || — || align=right | 5.5 km || 
|-id=542 bgcolor=#fefefe
| 78542 ||  || — || September 9, 2002 || Ondřejov || P. Kušnirák, P. Pravec || V || align=right | 1.4 km || 
|-id=543 bgcolor=#E9E9E9
| 78543 ||  || — || September 6, 2002 || Socorro || LINEAR || MRX || align=right | 3.3 km || 
|-id=544 bgcolor=#fefefe
| 78544 ||  || — || September 7, 2002 || Socorro || LINEAR || V || align=right | 1.6 km || 
|-id=545 bgcolor=#FA8072
| 78545 ||  || — || September 7, 2002 || Socorro || LINEAR || — || align=right | 1.6 km || 
|-id=546 bgcolor=#d6d6d6
| 78546 ||  || — || September 8, 2002 || Haleakala || NEAT || — || align=right | 11 km || 
|-id=547 bgcolor=#E9E9E9
| 78547 ||  || — || September 8, 2002 || Haleakala || NEAT || — || align=right | 5.5 km || 
|-id=548 bgcolor=#E9E9E9
| 78548 ||  || — || September 9, 2002 || Palomar || NEAT || — || align=right | 2.6 km || 
|-id=549 bgcolor=#E9E9E9
| 78549 ||  || — || September 9, 2002 || Palomar || NEAT || — || align=right | 5.6 km || 
|-id=550 bgcolor=#d6d6d6
| 78550 ||  || — || September 10, 2002 || Palomar || NEAT || — || align=right | 4.6 km || 
|-id=551 bgcolor=#d6d6d6
| 78551 ||  || — || September 10, 2002 || Palomar || NEAT || — || align=right | 8.5 km || 
|-id=552 bgcolor=#E9E9E9
| 78552 ||  || — || September 10, 2002 || Haleakala || NEAT || GEF || align=right | 2.5 km || 
|-id=553 bgcolor=#E9E9E9
| 78553 ||  || — || September 10, 2002 || Haleakala || NEAT || MAR || align=right | 1.7 km || 
|-id=554 bgcolor=#fefefe
| 78554 ||  || — || September 11, 2002 || Haleakala || NEAT || — || align=right | 2.0 km || 
|-id=555 bgcolor=#d6d6d6
| 78555 ||  || — || September 10, 2002 || Palomar || NEAT || — || align=right | 6.5 km || 
|-id=556 bgcolor=#fefefe
| 78556 ||  || — || September 11, 2002 || Haleakala || NEAT || V || align=right | 1.6 km || 
|-id=557 bgcolor=#E9E9E9
| 78557 ||  || — || September 11, 2002 || Haleakala || NEAT || — || align=right | 5.4 km || 
|-id=558 bgcolor=#d6d6d6
| 78558 ||  || — || September 12, 2002 || Palomar || NEAT || — || align=right | 4.0 km || 
|-id=559 bgcolor=#E9E9E9
| 78559 ||  || — || September 14, 2002 || Ametlla de Mar || Ametlla de Mar Obs. || MAR || align=right | 2.5 km || 
|-id=560 bgcolor=#d6d6d6
| 78560 ||  || — || September 10, 2002 || Haleakala || NEAT || EOS || align=right | 5.3 km || 
|-id=561 bgcolor=#fefefe
| 78561 ||  || — || September 10, 2002 || Haleakala || NEAT || — || align=right | 2.3 km || 
|-id=562 bgcolor=#d6d6d6
| 78562 ||  || — || September 12, 2002 || Palomar || NEAT || THM || align=right | 5.0 km || 
|-id=563 bgcolor=#fefefe
| 78563 ||  || — || September 13, 2002 || Palomar || NEAT || NYS || align=right | 1.4 km || 
|-id=564 bgcolor=#E9E9E9
| 78564 ||  || — || September 13, 2002 || Anderson Mesa || LONEOS || WIT || align=right | 2.2 km || 
|-id=565 bgcolor=#E9E9E9
| 78565 ||  || — || September 13, 2002 || Socorro || LINEAR || — || align=right | 3.1 km || 
|-id=566 bgcolor=#E9E9E9
| 78566 ||  || — || September 13, 2002 || Socorro || LINEAR || KRM || align=right | 5.8 km || 
|-id=567 bgcolor=#E9E9E9
| 78567 ||  || — || September 14, 2002 || Palomar || NEAT || — || align=right | 2.5 km || 
|-id=568 bgcolor=#d6d6d6
| 78568 ||  || — || September 13, 2002 || Goodricke-Pigott || R. A. Tucker || — || align=right | 7.0 km || 
|-id=569 bgcolor=#d6d6d6
| 78569 ||  || — || September 12, 2002 || Palomar || NEAT || — || align=right | 7.9 km || 
|-id=570 bgcolor=#E9E9E9
| 78570 ||  || — || September 12, 2002 || Haleakala || NEAT || — || align=right | 3.2 km || 
|-id=571 bgcolor=#E9E9E9
| 78571 ||  || — || September 13, 2002 || Goodricke-Pigott || R. A. Tucker || — || align=right | 4.3 km || 
|-id=572 bgcolor=#E9E9E9
| 78572 ||  || — || September 15, 2002 || Haleakala || NEAT || GEF || align=right | 2.7 km || 
|-id=573 bgcolor=#d6d6d6
| 78573 ||  || — || September 13, 2002 || Anderson Mesa || LONEOS || — || align=right | 4.9 km || 
|-id=574 bgcolor=#d6d6d6
| 78574 ||  || — || September 13, 2002 || Socorro || LINEAR || EOS || align=right | 3.8 km || 
|-id=575 bgcolor=#d6d6d6
| 78575 ||  || — || September 13, 2002 || Anderson Mesa || LONEOS || TEL || align=right | 3.8 km || 
|-id=576 bgcolor=#d6d6d6
| 78576 ||  || — || September 14, 2002 || Haleakala || NEAT || VER || align=right | 6.3 km || 
|-id=577 bgcolor=#d6d6d6
| 78577 JPL ||  ||  || September 10, 2002 || Wrightwood || J. W. Young || — || align=right | 4.2 km || 
|-id=578 bgcolor=#E9E9E9
| 78578 Donpettit ||  ||  || September 14, 2002 || Palomar || R. Matson || — || align=right | 1.4 km || 
|-id=579 bgcolor=#d6d6d6
| 78579 ||  || — || September 27, 2002 || Palomar || NEAT || — || align=right | 6.4 km || 
|-id=580 bgcolor=#E9E9E9
| 78580 ||  || — || September 27, 2002 || Palomar || NEAT || — || align=right | 2.5 km || 
|-id=581 bgcolor=#d6d6d6
| 78581 ||  || — || September 27, 2002 || Palomar || NEAT || KOR || align=right | 3.1 km || 
|-id=582 bgcolor=#fefefe
| 78582 ||  || — || September 27, 2002 || Palomar || NEAT || — || align=right | 1.7 km || 
|-id=583 bgcolor=#E9E9E9
| 78583 ||  || — || September 27, 2002 || Palomar || NEAT || HOF || align=right | 7.0 km || 
|-id=584 bgcolor=#d6d6d6
| 78584 ||  || — || September 27, 2002 || Palomar || NEAT || — || align=right | 5.9 km || 
|-id=585 bgcolor=#d6d6d6
| 78585 ||  || — || September 27, 2002 || Palomar || NEAT || — || align=right | 5.9 km || 
|-id=586 bgcolor=#d6d6d6
| 78586 ||  || — || September 27, 2002 || Palomar || NEAT || THM || align=right | 6.6 km || 
|-id=587 bgcolor=#FA8072
| 78587 ||  || — || September 27, 2002 || Palomar || NEAT || — || align=right | 3.1 km || 
|-id=588 bgcolor=#E9E9E9
| 78588 ||  || — || September 27, 2002 || Palomar || NEAT || — || align=right | 2.2 km || 
|-id=589 bgcolor=#E9E9E9
| 78589 ||  || — || September 27, 2002 || Palomar || NEAT || MAR || align=right | 2.4 km || 
|-id=590 bgcolor=#d6d6d6
| 78590 ||  || — || September 27, 2002 || Palomar || NEAT || — || align=right | 9.9 km || 
|-id=591 bgcolor=#E9E9E9
| 78591 ||  || — || September 27, 2002 || Socorro || LINEAR || — || align=right | 4.8 km || 
|-id=592 bgcolor=#E9E9E9
| 78592 ||  || — || September 27, 2002 || Socorro || LINEAR || — || align=right | 3.1 km || 
|-id=593 bgcolor=#E9E9E9
| 78593 ||  || — || September 27, 2002 || Anderson Mesa || LONEOS || — || align=right | 3.0 km || 
|-id=594 bgcolor=#d6d6d6
| 78594 ||  || — || September 26, 2002 || Palomar || NEAT || KAR || align=right | 2.3 km || 
|-id=595 bgcolor=#E9E9E9
| 78595 ||  || — || September 26, 2002 || Palomar || NEAT || — || align=right | 1.8 km || 
|-id=596 bgcolor=#d6d6d6
| 78596 ||  || — || September 26, 2002 || Palomar || NEAT || KOR || align=right | 3.1 km || 
|-id=597 bgcolor=#fefefe
| 78597 ||  || — || September 27, 2002 || Palomar || NEAT || V || align=right | 1.8 km || 
|-id=598 bgcolor=#d6d6d6
| 78598 ||  || — || September 28, 2002 || Palomar || NEAT || THM || align=right | 7.4 km || 
|-id=599 bgcolor=#d6d6d6
| 78599 ||  || — || September 29, 2002 || Haleakala || NEAT || — || align=right | 4.1 km || 
|-id=600 bgcolor=#d6d6d6
| 78600 ||  || — || September 29, 2002 || Haleakala || NEAT || HYG || align=right | 4.8 km || 
|}

78601–78700 

|-bgcolor=#d6d6d6
| 78601 ||  || — || September 28, 2002 || Haleakala || NEAT || EOS || align=right | 4.2 km || 
|-id=602 bgcolor=#E9E9E9
| 78602 ||  || — || September 28, 2002 || Haleakala || NEAT || MRX || align=right | 1.9 km || 
|-id=603 bgcolor=#E9E9E9
| 78603 ||  || — || September 28, 2002 || Haleakala || NEAT || — || align=right | 4.8 km || 
|-id=604 bgcolor=#E9E9E9
| 78604 ||  || — || September 29, 2002 || Haleakala || NEAT || PAD || align=right | 3.8 km || 
|-id=605 bgcolor=#d6d6d6
| 78605 ||  || — || September 30, 2002 || Nashville || R. Clingan || HYG || align=right | 7.0 km || 
|-id=606 bgcolor=#d6d6d6
| 78606 ||  || — || September 29, 2002 || Haleakala || NEAT || — || align=right | 5.9 km || 
|-id=607 bgcolor=#d6d6d6
| 78607 ||  || — || September 30, 2002 || Haleakala || NEAT || HYG || align=right | 7.2 km || 
|-id=608 bgcolor=#fefefe
| 78608 ||  || — || September 18, 2002 || Palomar || NEAT || — || align=right | 5.9 km || 
|-id=609 bgcolor=#E9E9E9
| 78609 ||  || — || September 21, 2002 || Palomar || NEAT || — || align=right | 4.9 km || 
|-id=610 bgcolor=#d6d6d6
| 78610 ||  || — || September 30, 2002 || Socorro || LINEAR || — || align=right | 6.0 km || 
|-id=611 bgcolor=#E9E9E9
| 78611 ||  || — || September 30, 2002 || Socorro || LINEAR || — || align=right | 3.5 km || 
|-id=612 bgcolor=#E9E9E9
| 78612 ||  || — || September 30, 2002 || Haleakala || NEAT || MAR || align=right | 2.8 km || 
|-id=613 bgcolor=#E9E9E9
| 78613 ||  || — || September 30, 2002 || Haleakala || NEAT || — || align=right | 5.5 km || 
|-id=614 bgcolor=#d6d6d6
| 78614 ||  || — || September 30, 2002 || Haleakala || NEAT || — || align=right | 4.0 km || 
|-id=615 bgcolor=#E9E9E9
| 78615 ||  || — || September 16, 2002 || Haleakala || NEAT || GEF || align=right | 4.2 km || 
|-id=616 bgcolor=#d6d6d6
| 78616 ||  || — || September 17, 2002 || Palomar || NEAT || EOS || align=right | 3.5 km || 
|-id=617 bgcolor=#d6d6d6
| 78617 ||  || — || October 1, 2002 || Anderson Mesa || LONEOS || — || align=right | 5.7 km || 
|-id=618 bgcolor=#E9E9E9
| 78618 ||  || — || October 1, 2002 || Socorro || LINEAR || MAR || align=right | 3.7 km || 
|-id=619 bgcolor=#d6d6d6
| 78619 ||  || — || October 1, 2002 || Socorro || LINEAR || HYG || align=right | 7.0 km || 
|-id=620 bgcolor=#d6d6d6
| 78620 ||  || — || October 1, 2002 || Anderson Mesa || LONEOS || — || align=right | 5.3 km || 
|-id=621 bgcolor=#E9E9E9
| 78621 ||  || — || October 1, 2002 || Haleakala || NEAT || — || align=right | 5.5 km || 
|-id=622 bgcolor=#d6d6d6
| 78622 ||  || — || October 1, 2002 || Socorro || LINEAR || — || align=right | 7.7 km || 
|-id=623 bgcolor=#E9E9E9
| 78623 ||  || — || October 1, 2002 || Socorro || LINEAR || WIT || align=right | 2.1 km || 
|-id=624 bgcolor=#E9E9E9
| 78624 ||  || — || October 1, 2002 || Anderson Mesa || LONEOS || WIT || align=right | 2.6 km || 
|-id=625 bgcolor=#d6d6d6
| 78625 ||  || — || October 1, 2002 || Anderson Mesa || LONEOS || — || align=right | 5.1 km || 
|-id=626 bgcolor=#fefefe
| 78626 ||  || — || October 2, 2002 || Socorro || LINEAR || — || align=right | 1.5 km || 
|-id=627 bgcolor=#d6d6d6
| 78627 ||  || — || October 2, 2002 || Socorro || LINEAR || HYG || align=right | 6.5 km || 
|-id=628 bgcolor=#d6d6d6
| 78628 ||  || — || October 2, 2002 || Socorro || LINEAR || — || align=right | 5.5 km || 
|-id=629 bgcolor=#d6d6d6
| 78629 ||  || — || October 2, 2002 || Socorro || LINEAR || EMA || align=right | 8.4 km || 
|-id=630 bgcolor=#E9E9E9
| 78630 ||  || — || October 2, 2002 || Socorro || LINEAR || — || align=right | 2.6 km || 
|-id=631 bgcolor=#d6d6d6
| 78631 ||  || — || October 2, 2002 || Socorro || LINEAR || — || align=right | 5.8 km || 
|-id=632 bgcolor=#d6d6d6
| 78632 ||  || — || October 2, 2002 || Socorro || LINEAR || THM || align=right | 6.1 km || 
|-id=633 bgcolor=#E9E9E9
| 78633 ||  || — || October 2, 2002 || Socorro || LINEAR || — || align=right | 6.4 km || 
|-id=634 bgcolor=#d6d6d6
| 78634 ||  || — || October 2, 2002 || Socorro || LINEAR || — || align=right | 3.3 km || 
|-id=635 bgcolor=#d6d6d6
| 78635 ||  || — || October 2, 2002 || Socorro || LINEAR || — || align=right | 5.3 km || 
|-id=636 bgcolor=#d6d6d6
| 78636 ||  || — || October 2, 2002 || Socorro || LINEAR || KOR || align=right | 2.8 km || 
|-id=637 bgcolor=#d6d6d6
| 78637 ||  || — || October 2, 2002 || Socorro || LINEAR || — || align=right | 8.5 km || 
|-id=638 bgcolor=#d6d6d6
| 78638 ||  || — || October 2, 2002 || Socorro || LINEAR || — || align=right | 6.5 km || 
|-id=639 bgcolor=#d6d6d6
| 78639 ||  || — || October 2, 2002 || Socorro || LINEAR || KOR || align=right | 1.9 km || 
|-id=640 bgcolor=#d6d6d6
| 78640 ||  || — || October 2, 2002 || Socorro || LINEAR || SAN || align=right | 3.9 km || 
|-id=641 bgcolor=#d6d6d6
| 78641 ||  || — || October 2, 2002 || Socorro || LINEAR || — || align=right | 3.6 km || 
|-id=642 bgcolor=#d6d6d6
| 78642 ||  || — || October 2, 2002 || Socorro || LINEAR || — || align=right | 5.4 km || 
|-id=643 bgcolor=#d6d6d6
| 78643 ||  || — || October 2, 2002 || Socorro || LINEAR || — || align=right | 5.9 km || 
|-id=644 bgcolor=#fefefe
| 78644 ||  || — || October 2, 2002 || Socorro || LINEAR || V || align=right | 2.0 km || 
|-id=645 bgcolor=#d6d6d6
| 78645 ||  || — || October 2, 2002 || Socorro || LINEAR || — || align=right | 6.5 km || 
|-id=646 bgcolor=#d6d6d6
| 78646 ||  || — || October 2, 2002 || Socorro || LINEAR || THM || align=right | 7.0 km || 
|-id=647 bgcolor=#fefefe
| 78647 ||  || — || October 2, 2002 || Socorro || LINEAR || — || align=right | 2.6 km || 
|-id=648 bgcolor=#d6d6d6
| 78648 ||  || — || October 2, 2002 || Socorro || LINEAR || — || align=right | 5.1 km || 
|-id=649 bgcolor=#E9E9E9
| 78649 ||  || — || October 2, 2002 || Socorro || LINEAR || — || align=right | 3.4 km || 
|-id=650 bgcolor=#d6d6d6
| 78650 ||  || — || October 2, 2002 || Socorro || LINEAR || — || align=right | 8.3 km || 
|-id=651 bgcolor=#d6d6d6
| 78651 ||  || — || October 2, 2002 || Socorro || LINEAR || — || align=right | 2.8 km || 
|-id=652 bgcolor=#E9E9E9
| 78652 Quero ||  ||  || October 3, 2002 || Campo Imperatore || CINEOS || — || align=right | 5.5 km || 
|-id=653 bgcolor=#fefefe
| 78653 ||  || — || October 4, 2002 || Socorro || LINEAR || — || align=right | 3.0 km || 
|-id=654 bgcolor=#E9E9E9
| 78654 ||  || — || October 3, 2002 || Palomar || NEAT || — || align=right | 2.3 km || 
|-id=655 bgcolor=#E9E9E9
| 78655 ||  || — || October 3, 2002 || Palomar || NEAT || — || align=right | 2.7 km || 
|-id=656 bgcolor=#d6d6d6
| 78656 ||  || — || October 3, 2002 || Palomar || NEAT || HYG || align=right | 7.4 km || 
|-id=657 bgcolor=#E9E9E9
| 78657 ||  || — || October 1, 2002 || Anderson Mesa || LONEOS || NEM || align=right | 5.4 km || 
|-id=658 bgcolor=#E9E9E9
| 78658 ||  || — || October 1, 2002 || Anderson Mesa || LONEOS || — || align=right | 3.7 km || 
|-id=659 bgcolor=#d6d6d6
| 78659 ||  || — || October 1, 2002 || Haleakala || NEAT || EOS || align=right | 4.2 km || 
|-id=660 bgcolor=#E9E9E9
| 78660 ||  || — || October 2, 2002 || Haleakala || NEAT || DOR || align=right | 6.5 km || 
|-id=661 bgcolor=#fefefe
| 78661 Castelfranco ||  ||  || October 2, 2002 || Campo Imperatore || CINEOS || — || align=right | 1.9 km || 
|-id=662 bgcolor=#d6d6d6
| 78662 ||  || — || October 3, 2002 || Socorro || LINEAR || — || align=right | 7.1 km || 
|-id=663 bgcolor=#d6d6d6
| 78663 ||  || — || October 3, 2002 || Palomar || NEAT || EOS || align=right | 3.7 km || 
|-id=664 bgcolor=#d6d6d6
| 78664 ||  || — || October 3, 2002 || Palomar || NEAT || — || align=right | 4.9 km || 
|-id=665 bgcolor=#d6d6d6
| 78665 ||  || — || October 3, 2002 || Palomar || NEAT || — || align=right | 6.0 km || 
|-id=666 bgcolor=#fefefe
| 78666 ||  || — || October 3, 2002 || Palomar || NEAT || — || align=right | 2.0 km || 
|-id=667 bgcolor=#E9E9E9
| 78667 ||  || — || October 2, 2002 || Haleakala || NEAT || — || align=right | 4.1 km || 
|-id=668 bgcolor=#d6d6d6
| 78668 ||  || — || October 4, 2002 || Socorro || LINEAR || — || align=right | 8.6 km || 
|-id=669 bgcolor=#d6d6d6
| 78669 ||  || — || October 5, 2002 || Kitt Peak || Spacewatch || — || align=right | 4.6 km || 
|-id=670 bgcolor=#fefefe
| 78670 ||  || — || October 1, 2002 || Anderson Mesa || LONEOS || V || align=right | 1.4 km || 
|-id=671 bgcolor=#d6d6d6
| 78671 ||  || — || October 1, 2002 || Haleakala || NEAT || EOS || align=right | 4.9 km || 
|-id=672 bgcolor=#fefefe
| 78672 ||  || — || October 3, 2002 || Socorro || LINEAR || FLO || align=right | 2.5 km || 
|-id=673 bgcolor=#d6d6d6
| 78673 ||  || — || October 3, 2002 || Palomar || NEAT || EOS || align=right | 5.7 km || 
|-id=674 bgcolor=#d6d6d6
| 78674 ||  || — || October 3, 2002 || Socorro || LINEAR || — || align=right | 7.2 km || 
|-id=675 bgcolor=#d6d6d6
| 78675 ||  || — || October 3, 2002 || Palomar || NEAT || — || align=right | 4.6 km || 
|-id=676 bgcolor=#d6d6d6
| 78676 ||  || — || October 4, 2002 || Palomar || NEAT || URS || align=right | 8.6 km || 
|-id=677 bgcolor=#E9E9E9
| 78677 ||  || — || October 4, 2002 || Palomar || NEAT || GEF || align=right | 3.4 km || 
|-id=678 bgcolor=#E9E9E9
| 78678 ||  || — || October 4, 2002 || Palomar || NEAT || — || align=right | 2.3 km || 
|-id=679 bgcolor=#d6d6d6
| 78679 ||  || — || October 4, 2002 || Palomar || NEAT || — || align=right | 3.9 km || 
|-id=680 bgcolor=#d6d6d6
| 78680 ||  || — || October 4, 2002 || Socorro || LINEAR || EOS || align=right | 4.6 km || 
|-id=681 bgcolor=#d6d6d6
| 78681 ||  || — || October 4, 2002 || Anderson Mesa || LONEOS || FIR || align=right | 6.5 km || 
|-id=682 bgcolor=#d6d6d6
| 78682 ||  || — || October 4, 2002 || Anderson Mesa || LONEOS || — || align=right | 4.7 km || 
|-id=683 bgcolor=#d6d6d6
| 78683 ||  || — || October 4, 2002 || Anderson Mesa || LONEOS || EOS || align=right | 5.5 km || 
|-id=684 bgcolor=#d6d6d6
| 78684 ||  || — || October 4, 2002 || Anderson Mesa || LONEOS || — || align=right | 4.1 km || 
|-id=685 bgcolor=#E9E9E9
| 78685 ||  || — || October 4, 2002 || Anderson Mesa || LONEOS || — || align=right | 6.3 km || 
|-id=686 bgcolor=#E9E9E9
| 78686 ||  || — || October 4, 2002 || Anderson Mesa || LONEOS || — || align=right | 2.1 km || 
|-id=687 bgcolor=#d6d6d6
| 78687 ||  || — || October 4, 2002 || Anderson Mesa || LONEOS || EOS || align=right | 5.2 km || 
|-id=688 bgcolor=#d6d6d6
| 78688 ||  || — || October 4, 2002 || Anderson Mesa || LONEOS || EOS || align=right | 7.1 km || 
|-id=689 bgcolor=#d6d6d6
| 78689 ||  || — || October 5, 2002 || Palomar || NEAT || — || align=right | 4.8 km || 
|-id=690 bgcolor=#d6d6d6
| 78690 ||  || — || October 5, 2002 || Palomar || NEAT || — || align=right | 12 km || 
|-id=691 bgcolor=#E9E9E9
| 78691 ||  || — || October 5, 2002 || Palomar || NEAT || EUN || align=right | 3.4 km || 
|-id=692 bgcolor=#d6d6d6
| 78692 ||  || — || October 3, 2002 || Palomar || NEAT || 7:4 || align=right | 12 km || 
|-id=693 bgcolor=#d6d6d6
| 78693 ||  || — || October 3, 2002 || Palomar || NEAT || — || align=right | 11 km || 
|-id=694 bgcolor=#E9E9E9
| 78694 ||  || — || October 3, 2002 || Palomar || NEAT || ADE || align=right | 5.8 km || 
|-id=695 bgcolor=#E9E9E9
| 78695 ||  || — || October 3, 2002 || Palomar || NEAT || — || align=right | 6.0 km || 
|-id=696 bgcolor=#fefefe
| 78696 ||  || — || October 3, 2002 || Palomar || NEAT || — || align=right | 1.8 km || 
|-id=697 bgcolor=#d6d6d6
| 78697 ||  || — || October 3, 2002 || Palomar || NEAT || — || align=right | 5.5 km || 
|-id=698 bgcolor=#d6d6d6
| 78698 ||  || — || October 3, 2002 || Palomar || NEAT || EUP || align=right | 12 km || 
|-id=699 bgcolor=#d6d6d6
| 78699 ||  || — || October 4, 2002 || Anderson Mesa || LONEOS || EUP || align=right | 10 km || 
|-id=700 bgcolor=#d6d6d6
| 78700 ||  || — || October 4, 2002 || Socorro || LINEAR || EOS || align=right | 3.6 km || 
|}

78701–78800 

|-bgcolor=#E9E9E9
| 78701 ||  || — || October 4, 2002 || Anderson Mesa || LONEOS || fast? || align=right | 4.7 km || 
|-id=702 bgcolor=#E9E9E9
| 78702 ||  || — || October 4, 2002 || Anderson Mesa || LONEOS || EUN || align=right | 3.0 km || 
|-id=703 bgcolor=#d6d6d6
| 78703 ||  || — || October 4, 2002 || Anderson Mesa || LONEOS || — || align=right | 5.6 km || 
|-id=704 bgcolor=#E9E9E9
| 78704 ||  || — || October 11, 2002 || Palomar || NEAT || — || align=right | 10 km || 
|-id=705 bgcolor=#E9E9E9
| 78705 ||  || — || October 14, 2002 || Socorro || LINEAR || — || align=right | 4.6 km || 
|-id=706 bgcolor=#d6d6d6
| 78706 ||  || — || October 3, 2002 || Socorro || LINEAR || HYG || align=right | 7.2 km || 
|-id=707 bgcolor=#d6d6d6
| 78707 ||  || — || October 3, 2002 || Socorro || LINEAR || THM || align=right | 6.8 km || 
|-id=708 bgcolor=#d6d6d6
| 78708 ||  || — || October 4, 2002 || Socorro || LINEAR || — || align=right | 5.9 km || 
|-id=709 bgcolor=#E9E9E9
| 78709 ||  || — || October 4, 2002 || Socorro || LINEAR || KRM || align=right | 6.2 km || 
|-id=710 bgcolor=#fefefe
| 78710 ||  || — || October 4, 2002 || Socorro || LINEAR || NYS || align=right | 1.5 km || 
|-id=711 bgcolor=#fefefe
| 78711 ||  || — || October 4, 2002 || Socorro || LINEAR || ERI || align=right | 3.9 km || 
|-id=712 bgcolor=#d6d6d6
| 78712 ||  || — || October 5, 2002 || Anderson Mesa || LONEOS || — || align=right | 5.6 km || 
|-id=713 bgcolor=#d6d6d6
| 78713 ||  || — || October 5, 2002 || Anderson Mesa || LONEOS || 7:4 || align=right | 6.9 km || 
|-id=714 bgcolor=#E9E9E9
| 78714 ||  || — || October 6, 2002 || Anderson Mesa || LONEOS || — || align=right | 2.8 km || 
|-id=715 bgcolor=#E9E9E9
| 78715 ||  || — || October 6, 2002 || Anderson Mesa || LONEOS || — || align=right | 4.4 km || 
|-id=716 bgcolor=#E9E9E9
| 78716 ||  || — || October 7, 2002 || Socorro || LINEAR || — || align=right | 3.0 km || 
|-id=717 bgcolor=#d6d6d6
| 78717 ||  || — || October 5, 2002 || Socorro || LINEAR || EOS || align=right | 4.4 km || 
|-id=718 bgcolor=#d6d6d6
| 78718 ||  || — || October 4, 2002 || Socorro || LINEAR || EOS || align=right | 4.1 km || 
|-id=719 bgcolor=#d6d6d6
| 78719 ||  || — || October 4, 2002 || Socorro || LINEAR || EOS || align=right | 4.1 km || 
|-id=720 bgcolor=#d6d6d6
| 78720 ||  || — || October 6, 2002 || Socorro || LINEAR || EOS || align=right | 4.3 km || 
|-id=721 bgcolor=#d6d6d6
| 78721 ||  || — || October 5, 2002 || Socorro || LINEAR || EOS || align=right | 4.8 km || 
|-id=722 bgcolor=#d6d6d6
| 78722 ||  || — || October 6, 2002 || Haleakala || NEAT || — || align=right | 6.5 km || 
|-id=723 bgcolor=#E9E9E9
| 78723 ||  || — || October 8, 2002 || Anderson Mesa || LONEOS || — || align=right | 2.4 km || 
|-id=724 bgcolor=#d6d6d6
| 78724 ||  || — || October 6, 2002 || Haleakala || NEAT || TIR || align=right | 8.0 km || 
|-id=725 bgcolor=#d6d6d6
| 78725 ||  || — || October 6, 2002 || Haleakala || NEAT || 7:4 || align=right | 8.6 km || 
|-id=726 bgcolor=#d6d6d6
| 78726 ||  || — || October 8, 2002 || Palomar || NEAT || VER || align=right | 5.6 km || 
|-id=727 bgcolor=#d6d6d6
| 78727 ||  || — || October 8, 2002 || Palomar || NEAT || — || align=right | 4.2 km || 
|-id=728 bgcolor=#E9E9E9
| 78728 ||  || — || October 6, 2002 || Socorro || LINEAR || JUN || align=right | 2.8 km || 
|-id=729 bgcolor=#E9E9E9
| 78729 ||  || — || October 6, 2002 || Socorro || LINEAR || MAR || align=right | 3.8 km || 
|-id=730 bgcolor=#d6d6d6
| 78730 ||  || — || October 7, 2002 || Socorro || LINEAR || — || align=right | 8.3 km || 
|-id=731 bgcolor=#d6d6d6
| 78731 ||  || — || October 9, 2002 || Socorro || LINEAR || — || align=right | 7.8 km || 
|-id=732 bgcolor=#d6d6d6
| 78732 ||  || — || October 9, 2002 || Anderson Mesa || LONEOS || — || align=right | 8.3 km || 
|-id=733 bgcolor=#E9E9E9
| 78733 ||  || — || October 9, 2002 || Socorro || LINEAR || PAD || align=right | 3.5 km || 
|-id=734 bgcolor=#d6d6d6
| 78734 ||  || — || October 7, 2002 || Haleakala || NEAT || HYG || align=right | 5.8 km || 
|-id=735 bgcolor=#d6d6d6
| 78735 ||  || — || October 8, 2002 || Anderson Mesa || LONEOS || — || align=right | 3.7 km || 
|-id=736 bgcolor=#d6d6d6
| 78736 ||  || — || October 9, 2002 || Socorro || LINEAR || — || align=right | 7.5 km || 
|-id=737 bgcolor=#d6d6d6
| 78737 ||  || — || October 10, 2002 || Socorro || LINEAR || — || align=right | 6.5 km || 
|-id=738 bgcolor=#E9E9E9
| 78738 ||  || — || October 8, 2002 || Anderson Mesa || LONEOS || — || align=right | 3.7 km || 
|-id=739 bgcolor=#d6d6d6
| 78739 ||  || — || October 9, 2002 || Socorro || LINEAR || EOS || align=right | 4.5 km || 
|-id=740 bgcolor=#fefefe
| 78740 ||  || — || October 9, 2002 || Socorro || LINEAR || V || align=right | 1.5 km || 
|-id=741 bgcolor=#d6d6d6
| 78741 ||  || — || October 9, 2002 || Socorro || LINEAR || HYG || align=right | 9.9 km || 
|-id=742 bgcolor=#E9E9E9
| 78742 ||  || — || October 9, 2002 || Socorro || LINEAR || — || align=right | 4.8 km || 
|-id=743 bgcolor=#d6d6d6
| 78743 ||  || — || October 9, 2002 || Socorro || LINEAR || HYG || align=right | 7.4 km || 
|-id=744 bgcolor=#d6d6d6
| 78744 ||  || — || October 9, 2002 || Socorro || LINEAR || HYG || align=right | 7.3 km || 
|-id=745 bgcolor=#d6d6d6
| 78745 ||  || — || October 9, 2002 || Socorro || LINEAR || — || align=right | 6.8 km || 
|-id=746 bgcolor=#d6d6d6
| 78746 ||  || — || October 9, 2002 || Socorro || LINEAR || — || align=right | 6.3 km || 
|-id=747 bgcolor=#E9E9E9
| 78747 ||  || — || October 9, 2002 || Socorro || LINEAR || — || align=right | 2.7 km || 
|-id=748 bgcolor=#E9E9E9
| 78748 ||  || — || October 9, 2002 || Socorro || LINEAR || PAD || align=right | 5.7 km || 
|-id=749 bgcolor=#d6d6d6
| 78749 ||  || — || October 10, 2002 || Socorro || LINEAR || EOS || align=right | 5.5 km || 
|-id=750 bgcolor=#E9E9E9
| 78750 ||  || — || October 10, 2002 || Socorro || LINEAR || — || align=right | 3.4 km || 
|-id=751 bgcolor=#d6d6d6
| 78751 ||  || — || October 10, 2002 || Socorro || LINEAR || EOS || align=right | 8.2 km || 
|-id=752 bgcolor=#d6d6d6
| 78752 ||  || — || October 10, 2002 || Socorro || LINEAR || — || align=right | 9.5 km || 
|-id=753 bgcolor=#E9E9E9
| 78753 ||  || — || October 10, 2002 || Socorro || LINEAR || — || align=right | 5.5 km || 
|-id=754 bgcolor=#d6d6d6
| 78754 ||  || — || October 13, 2002 || Palomar || NEAT || 627 || align=right | 13 km || 
|-id=755 bgcolor=#E9E9E9
| 78755 ||  || — || October 13, 2002 || Palomar || NEAT || INO || align=right | 3.3 km || 
|-id=756 bgcolor=#d6d6d6
| 78756 Sloan ||  ||  || October 10, 2002 || Apache Point || SDSS || — || align=right | 4.4 km || 
|-id=757 bgcolor=#E9E9E9
| 78757 || 2002 UM || — || October 22, 2002 || Palomar || NEAT || HNS || align=right | 3.8 km || 
|-id=758 bgcolor=#d6d6d6
| 78758 ||  || — || October 27, 2002 || Socorro || LINEAR || — || align=right | 9.0 km || 
|-id=759 bgcolor=#d6d6d6
| 78759 ||  || — || October 25, 2002 || Palomar || NEAT || EOS || align=right | 4.9 km || 
|-id=760 bgcolor=#d6d6d6
| 78760 ||  || — || October 28, 2002 || Palomar || NEAT || EOS || align=right | 4.1 km || 
|-id=761 bgcolor=#E9E9E9
| 78761 ||  || — || October 28, 2002 || Palomar || NEAT || — || align=right | 6.7 km || 
|-id=762 bgcolor=#d6d6d6
| 78762 ||  || — || October 30, 2002 || Haleakala || NEAT || THM || align=right | 6.2 km || 
|-id=763 bgcolor=#E9E9E9
| 78763 ||  || — || October 31, 2002 || Socorro || LINEAR || — || align=right | 5.1 km || 
|-id=764 bgcolor=#E9E9E9
| 78764 ||  || — || October 31, 2002 || Anderson Mesa || LONEOS || — || align=right | 2.6 km || 
|-id=765 bgcolor=#E9E9E9
| 78765 ||  || — || October 30, 2002 || Haleakala || NEAT || — || align=right | 5.2 km || 
|-id=766 bgcolor=#d6d6d6
| 78766 ||  || — || October 31, 2002 || Palomar || NEAT || — || align=right | 6.4 km || 
|-id=767 bgcolor=#d6d6d6
| 78767 ||  || — || November 1, 2002 || Palomar || NEAT || — || align=right | 8.8 km || 
|-id=768 bgcolor=#E9E9E9
| 78768 ||  || — || November 5, 2002 || Socorro || LINEAR || — || align=right | 7.1 km || 
|-id=769 bgcolor=#d6d6d6
| 78769 ||  || — || November 5, 2002 || Anderson Mesa || LONEOS || — || align=right | 5.4 km || 
|-id=770 bgcolor=#d6d6d6
| 78770 ||  || — || November 5, 2002 || Socorro || LINEAR || — || align=right | 6.6 km || 
|-id=771 bgcolor=#d6d6d6
| 78771 ||  || — || November 5, 2002 || Socorro || LINEAR || EOS || align=right | 3.9 km || 
|-id=772 bgcolor=#E9E9E9
| 78772 ||  || — || November 4, 2002 || Haleakala || NEAT || GER || align=right | 4.3 km || 
|-id=773 bgcolor=#E9E9E9
| 78773 ||  || — || November 6, 2002 || Anderson Mesa || LONEOS || — || align=right | 2.3 km || 
|-id=774 bgcolor=#fefefe
| 78774 ||  || — || November 6, 2002 || Socorro || LINEAR || — || align=right | 2.4 km || 
|-id=775 bgcolor=#d6d6d6
| 78775 ||  || — || November 5, 2002 || Socorro || LINEAR || — || align=right | 7.7 km || 
|-id=776 bgcolor=#d6d6d6
| 78776 ||  || — || November 7, 2002 || Socorro || LINEAR || — || align=right | 7.7 km || 
|-id=777 bgcolor=#E9E9E9
| 78777 ||  || — || November 7, 2002 || Socorro || LINEAR || — || align=right | 3.2 km || 
|-id=778 bgcolor=#d6d6d6
| 78778 ||  || — || November 7, 2002 || Socorro || LINEAR || — || align=right | 7.6 km || 
|-id=779 bgcolor=#d6d6d6
| 78779 ||  || — || November 8, 2002 || Socorro || LINEAR || — || align=right | 7.8 km || 
|-id=780 bgcolor=#d6d6d6
| 78780 ||  || — || November 7, 2002 || Socorro || LINEAR || — || align=right | 6.1 km || 
|-id=781 bgcolor=#d6d6d6
| 78781 ||  || — || November 7, 2002 || Socorro || LINEAR || — || align=right | 5.3 km || 
|-id=782 bgcolor=#d6d6d6
| 78782 ||  || — || November 7, 2002 || Socorro || LINEAR || — || align=right | 3.1 km || 
|-id=783 bgcolor=#E9E9E9
| 78783 ||  || — || November 7, 2002 || Socorro || LINEAR || — || align=right | 5.8 km || 
|-id=784 bgcolor=#d6d6d6
| 78784 ||  || — || November 7, 2002 || Socorro || LINEAR || — || align=right | 7.5 km || 
|-id=785 bgcolor=#E9E9E9
| 78785 ||  || — || November 10, 2002 || Socorro || LINEAR || — || align=right | 3.5 km || 
|-id=786 bgcolor=#E9E9E9
| 78786 ||  || — || November 8, 2002 || Socorro || LINEAR || — || align=right | 2.7 km || 
|-id=787 bgcolor=#d6d6d6
| 78787 ||  || — || November 13, 2002 || Palomar || NEAT || — || align=right | 5.9 km || 
|-id=788 bgcolor=#E9E9E9
| 78788 ||  || — || November 13, 2002 || Palomar || NEAT || — || align=right | 4.8 km || 
|-id=789 bgcolor=#E9E9E9
| 78789 ||  || — || November 13, 2002 || Palomar || NEAT || EUN || align=right | 2.9 km || 
|-id=790 bgcolor=#fefefe
| 78790 ||  || — || November 12, 2002 || Palomar || NEAT || — || align=right | 3.3 km || 
|-id=791 bgcolor=#E9E9E9
| 78791 ||  || — || November 14, 2002 || Palomar || NEAT || — || align=right | 5.9 km || 
|-id=792 bgcolor=#d6d6d6
| 78792 ||  || — || November 30, 2002 || Socorro || LINEAR || ALA || align=right | 9.8 km || 
|-id=793 bgcolor=#E9E9E9
| 78793 ||  || — || November 30, 2002 || Socorro || LINEAR || — || align=right | 5.8 km || 
|-id=794 bgcolor=#d6d6d6
| 78794 ||  || — || November 28, 2002 || Anderson Mesa || LONEOS || — || align=right | 8.3 km || 
|-id=795 bgcolor=#d6d6d6
| 78795 ||  || — || November 30, 2002 || Socorro || LINEAR || — || align=right | 10 km || 
|-id=796 bgcolor=#d6d6d6
| 78796 ||  || — || December 3, 2002 || Palomar || NEAT || — || align=right | 3.8 km || 
|-id=797 bgcolor=#d6d6d6
| 78797 ||  || — || December 12, 2002 || Haleakala || NEAT || ALA || align=right | 9.8 km || 
|-id=798 bgcolor=#fefefe
| 78798 ||  || — || December 11, 2002 || Socorro || LINEAR || V || align=right | 2.1 km || 
|-id=799 bgcolor=#C2E0FF
| 78799 ||  || — || December 10, 2002 || Palomar || Palomar Obs. || centaur || align=right | 445 km || 
|-id=800 bgcolor=#d6d6d6
| 78800 ||  || — || January 7, 2003 || Socorro || LINEAR || — || align=right | 10 km || 
|}

78801–78900 

|-bgcolor=#d6d6d6
| 78801 ||  || — || January 2, 2003 || Socorro || LINEAR || — || align=right | 4.9 km || 
|-id=802 bgcolor=#d6d6d6
| 78802 ||  || — || February 7, 2003 || Socorro || LINEAR || — || align=right | 8.5 km || 
|-id=803 bgcolor=#d6d6d6
| 78803 ||  || — || June 26, 2003 || Socorro || LINEAR || — || align=right | 6.1 km || 
|-id=804 bgcolor=#E9E9E9
| 78804 ||  || — || July 1, 2003 || Socorro || LINEAR || — || align=right | 3.0 km || 
|-id=805 bgcolor=#fefefe
| 78805 ||  || — || July 2, 2003 || Socorro || LINEAR || FLO || align=right | 1.0 km || 
|-id=806 bgcolor=#d6d6d6
| 78806 ||  || — || July 22, 2003 || Haleakala || NEAT || — || align=right | 5.4 km || 
|-id=807 bgcolor=#fefefe
| 78807 ||  || — || July 28, 2003 || Palomar || NEAT || — || align=right | 2.7 km || 
|-id=808 bgcolor=#E9E9E9
| 78808 ||  || — || July 22, 2003 || Palomar || NEAT || EUN || align=right | 2.8 km || 
|-id=809 bgcolor=#d6d6d6
| 78809 ||  || — || July 30, 2003 || Socorro || LINEAR || Tj (2.92) || align=right | 15 km || 
|-id=810 bgcolor=#fefefe
| 78810 ||  || — || July 30, 2003 || Socorro || LINEAR || — || align=right | 1.9 km || 
|-id=811 bgcolor=#d6d6d6
| 78811 || 2003 PD || — || August 1, 2003 || Socorro || LINEAR || HYG || align=right | 3.9 km || 
|-id=812 bgcolor=#fefefe
| 78812 ||  || — || August 1, 2003 || Socorro || LINEAR || NYS || align=right | 1.4 km || 
|-id=813 bgcolor=#d6d6d6
| 78813 ||  || — || August 2, 2003 || Haleakala || NEAT || KOR || align=right | 2.5 km || 
|-id=814 bgcolor=#d6d6d6
| 78814 ||  || — || August 2, 2003 || Haleakala || NEAT || 7:4 || align=right | 6.4 km || 
|-id=815 bgcolor=#d6d6d6
| 78815 ||  || — || August 1, 2003 || Socorro || LINEAR || HIL3:2 || align=right | 15 km || 
|-id=816 bgcolor=#d6d6d6
| 78816 Caripito ||  ||  || August 4, 2003 || Needville || J. Dellinger || — || align=right | 5.3 km || 
|-id=817 bgcolor=#E9E9E9
| 78817 ||  || — || August 20, 2003 || Palomar || NEAT || — || align=right | 3.3 km || 
|-id=818 bgcolor=#d6d6d6
| 78818 ||  || — || August 17, 2003 || Kvistaberg || UDAS || — || align=right | 7.3 km || 
|-id=819 bgcolor=#d6d6d6
| 78819 ||  || — || August 20, 2003 || Campo Imperatore || CINEOS || — || align=right | 5.8 km || 
|-id=820 bgcolor=#E9E9E9
| 78820 ||  || — || August 20, 2003 || Palomar || NEAT || — || align=right | 4.0 km || 
|-id=821 bgcolor=#E9E9E9
| 78821 ||  || — || August 20, 2003 || Haleakala || NEAT || — || align=right | 5.9 km || 
|-id=822 bgcolor=#fefefe
| 78822 ||  || — || August 22, 2003 || Haleakala || NEAT || ERI || align=right | 3.0 km || 
|-id=823 bgcolor=#d6d6d6
| 78823 ||  || — || August 22, 2003 || Haleakala || NEAT || HYG || align=right | 4.5 km || 
|-id=824 bgcolor=#fefefe
| 78824 ||  || — || August 22, 2003 || Haleakala || NEAT || NYS || align=right | 1.3 km || 
|-id=825 bgcolor=#E9E9E9
| 78825 ||  || — || August 20, 2003 || Palomar || NEAT || — || align=right | 1.8 km || 
|-id=826 bgcolor=#fefefe
| 78826 ||  || — || August 22, 2003 || Palomar || NEAT || ERI || align=right | 4.4 km || 
|-id=827 bgcolor=#fefefe
| 78827 ||  || — || August 22, 2003 || Palomar || NEAT || FLO || align=right | 1.3 km || 
|-id=828 bgcolor=#d6d6d6
| 78828 ||  || — || August 22, 2003 || Palomar || NEAT || — || align=right | 7.4 km || 
|-id=829 bgcolor=#E9E9E9
| 78829 ||  || — || August 20, 2003 || Haleakala || NEAT || — || align=right | 5.1 km || 
|-id=830 bgcolor=#d6d6d6
| 78830 Simonadirubbo ||  ||  || August 22, 2003 || Campo Imperatore || CINEOS || TEL || align=right | 3.5 km || 
|-id=831 bgcolor=#d6d6d6
| 78831 ||  || — || August 22, 2003 || Palomar || NEAT || — || align=right | 5.5 km || 
|-id=832 bgcolor=#E9E9E9
| 78832 ||  || — || August 22, 2003 || Haleakala || NEAT || — || align=right | 5.0 km || 
|-id=833 bgcolor=#fefefe
| 78833 ||  || — || August 22, 2003 || Palomar || NEAT || — || align=right | 1.7 km || 
|-id=834 bgcolor=#fefefe
| 78834 ||  || — || August 22, 2003 || Palomar || NEAT || FLO || align=right | 1.0 km || 
|-id=835 bgcolor=#fefefe
| 78835 ||  || — || August 22, 2003 || Socorro || LINEAR || — || align=right | 1.4 km || 
|-id=836 bgcolor=#fefefe
| 78836 ||  || — || August 22, 2003 || Socorro || LINEAR || — || align=right | 1.4 km || 
|-id=837 bgcolor=#d6d6d6
| 78837 ||  || — || August 22, 2003 || Socorro || LINEAR || — || align=right | 9.7 km || 
|-id=838 bgcolor=#E9E9E9
| 78838 ||  || — || August 22, 2003 || Haleakala || NEAT || — || align=right | 4.6 km || 
|-id=839 bgcolor=#fefefe
| 78839 ||  || — || August 23, 2003 || Palomar || NEAT || — || align=right | 1.5 km || 
|-id=840 bgcolor=#fefefe
| 78840 ||  || — || August 24, 2003 || Socorro || LINEAR || — || align=right | 1.7 km || 
|-id=841 bgcolor=#fefefe
| 78841 ||  || — || August 24, 2003 || Socorro || LINEAR || V || align=right | 1.5 km || 
|-id=842 bgcolor=#E9E9E9
| 78842 ||  || — || August 24, 2003 || Socorro || LINEAR || — || align=right | 6.6 km || 
|-id=843 bgcolor=#E9E9E9
| 78843 ||  || — || August 22, 2003 || Palomar || NEAT || — || align=right | 1.9 km || 
|-id=844 bgcolor=#d6d6d6
| 78844 ||  || — || August 22, 2003 || Campo Imperatore || CINEOS || EOS || align=right | 4.3 km || 
|-id=845 bgcolor=#fefefe
| 78845 ||  || — || August 23, 2003 || Socorro || LINEAR || NYS || align=right | 1.4 km || 
|-id=846 bgcolor=#fefefe
| 78846 ||  || — || August 23, 2003 || Socorro || LINEAR || — || align=right | 1.4 km || 
|-id=847 bgcolor=#d6d6d6
| 78847 ||  || — || August 23, 2003 || Socorro || LINEAR || EOS || align=right | 4.9 km || 
|-id=848 bgcolor=#E9E9E9
| 78848 ||  || — || August 23, 2003 || Socorro || LINEAR || — || align=right | 4.4 km || 
|-id=849 bgcolor=#fefefe
| 78849 ||  || — || August 23, 2003 || Socorro || LINEAR || FLO || align=right | 1.4 km || 
|-id=850 bgcolor=#E9E9E9
| 78850 ||  || — || August 23, 2003 || Socorro || LINEAR || EUN || align=right | 3.1 km || 
|-id=851 bgcolor=#fefefe
| 78851 ||  || — || August 23, 2003 || Socorro || LINEAR || FLO || align=right | 1.5 km || 
|-id=852 bgcolor=#fefefe
| 78852 ||  || — || August 23, 2003 || Socorro || LINEAR || — || align=right | 2.7 km || 
|-id=853 bgcolor=#d6d6d6
| 78853 ||  || — || August 23, 2003 || Socorro || LINEAR || — || align=right | 4.9 km || 
|-id=854 bgcolor=#d6d6d6
| 78854 ||  || — || August 23, 2003 || Socorro || LINEAR || — || align=right | 4.7 km || 
|-id=855 bgcolor=#E9E9E9
| 78855 ||  || — || August 22, 2003 || Socorro || LINEAR || — || align=right | 4.7 km || 
|-id=856 bgcolor=#fefefe
| 78856 ||  || — || August 25, 2003 || Socorro || LINEAR || fast? || align=right | 1.5 km || 
|-id=857 bgcolor=#fefefe
| 78857 ||  || — || August 22, 2003 || Campo Imperatore || CINEOS || H || align=right | 2.6 km || 
|-id=858 bgcolor=#E9E9E9
| 78858 ||  || — || August 24, 2003 || Socorro || LINEAR || — || align=right | 4.1 km || 
|-id=859 bgcolor=#E9E9E9
| 78859 ||  || — || August 24, 2003 || Socorro || LINEAR || AGN || align=right | 3.0 km || 
|-id=860 bgcolor=#d6d6d6
| 78860 ||  || — || August 24, 2003 || Socorro || LINEAR || — || align=right | 3.9 km || 
|-id=861 bgcolor=#fefefe
| 78861 ||  || — || August 24, 2003 || Socorro || LINEAR || — || align=right | 2.1 km || 
|-id=862 bgcolor=#d6d6d6
| 78862 ||  || — || August 24, 2003 || Socorro || LINEAR || EUP || align=right | 8.1 km || 
|-id=863 bgcolor=#d6d6d6
| 78863 ||  || — || August 24, 2003 || Socorro || LINEAR || — || align=right | 8.9 km || 
|-id=864 bgcolor=#fefefe
| 78864 ||  || — || August 24, 2003 || Socorro || LINEAR || FLO || align=right | 1.5 km || 
|-id=865 bgcolor=#d6d6d6
| 78865 ||  || — || August 24, 2003 || Socorro || LINEAR || EOS || align=right | 4.9 km || 
|-id=866 bgcolor=#E9E9E9
| 78866 ||  || — || August 27, 2003 || Socorro || LINEAR || — || align=right | 4.6 km || 
|-id=867 bgcolor=#d6d6d6
| 78867 Isakowitz ||  ||  || August 23, 2003 || Cerro Tololo || M. W. Buie || 3:2 || align=right | 7.7 km || 
|-id=868 bgcolor=#fefefe
| 78868 ||  || — || August 25, 2003 || Socorro || LINEAR || — || align=right | 1.9 km || 
|-id=869 bgcolor=#d6d6d6
| 78869 ||  || — || August 25, 2003 || Socorro || LINEAR || HYG || align=right | 10 km || 
|-id=870 bgcolor=#E9E9E9
| 78870 ||  || — || August 28, 2003 || Haleakala || NEAT || — || align=right | 1.7 km || 
|-id=871 bgcolor=#E9E9E9
| 78871 ||  || — || August 30, 2003 || Kitt Peak || Spacewatch || — || align=right | 5.3 km || 
|-id=872 bgcolor=#E9E9E9
| 78872 ||  || — || August 31, 2003 || Kitt Peak || Spacewatch || — || align=right | 2.7 km || 
|-id=873 bgcolor=#E9E9E9
| 78873 ||  || — || August 31, 2003 || Haleakala || NEAT || — || align=right | 6.5 km || 
|-id=874 bgcolor=#E9E9E9
| 78874 ||  || — || August 31, 2003 || Haleakala || NEAT || — || align=right | 1.7 km || 
|-id=875 bgcolor=#fefefe
| 78875 ||  || — || September 2, 2003 || Socorro || LINEAR || — || align=right | 3.0 km || 
|-id=876 bgcolor=#E9E9E9
| 78876 ||  || — || September 4, 2003 || Haleakala || NEAT || — || align=right | 3.5 km || 
|-id=877 bgcolor=#fefefe
| 78877 ||  || — || September 4, 2003 || Socorro || LINEAR || — || align=right | 3.1 km || 
|-id=878 bgcolor=#fefefe
| 78878 ||  || — || September 15, 2003 || Palomar || NEAT || — || align=right | 1.2 km || 
|-id=879 bgcolor=#d6d6d6
| 78879 ||  || — || September 15, 2003 || Haleakala || NEAT || — || align=right | 4.5 km || 
|-id=880 bgcolor=#fefefe
| 78880 ||  || — || September 13, 2003 || Anderson Mesa || LONEOS || — || align=right | 1.3 km || 
|-id=881 bgcolor=#d6d6d6
| 78881 ||  || — || September 15, 2003 || Haleakala || NEAT || BRA || align=right | 3.6 km || 
|-id=882 bgcolor=#fefefe
| 78882 ||  || — || September 13, 2003 || Haleakala || NEAT || — || align=right | 2.5 km || 
|-id=883 bgcolor=#E9E9E9
| 78883 ||  || — || September 15, 2003 || Palomar || NEAT || — || align=right | 2.1 km || 
|-id=884 bgcolor=#d6d6d6
| 78884 ||  || — || September 16, 2003 || Palomar || NEAT || 7:4 || align=right | 8.5 km || 
|-id=885 bgcolor=#d6d6d6
| 78885 ||  || — || September 16, 2003 || Kitt Peak || Spacewatch || KOR || align=right | 3.1 km || 
|-id=886 bgcolor=#d6d6d6
| 78886 ||  || — || September 16, 2003 || Kitt Peak || Spacewatch || — || align=right | 4.4 km || 
|-id=887 bgcolor=#fefefe
| 78887 ||  || — || September 17, 2003 || Črni Vrh || J. Skvarč || — || align=right | 1.9 km || 
|-id=888 bgcolor=#d6d6d6
| 78888 ||  || — || September 19, 2003 || Socorro || LINEAR || THM || align=right | 5.1 km || 
|-id=889 bgcolor=#fefefe
| 78889 ||  || — || September 18, 2003 || Socorro || LINEAR || ERI || align=right | 3.8 km || 
|-id=890 bgcolor=#fefefe
| 78890 ||  || — || September 16, 2003 || Palomar || NEAT || V || align=right | 1.2 km || 
|-id=891 bgcolor=#d6d6d6
| 78891 ||  || — || September 16, 2003 || Palomar || NEAT || — || align=right | 7.4 km || 
|-id=892 bgcolor=#d6d6d6
| 78892 ||  || — || September 16, 2003 || Anderson Mesa || LONEOS || — || align=right | 5.3 km || 
|-id=893 bgcolor=#d6d6d6
| 78893 ||  || — || September 18, 2003 || Kitt Peak || Spacewatch || HYG || align=right | 4.8 km || 
|-id=894 bgcolor=#fefefe
| 78894 ||  || — || September 18, 2003 || Palomar || NEAT || V || align=right | 1.2 km || 
|-id=895 bgcolor=#E9E9E9
| 78895 ||  || — || September 19, 2003 || Palomar || NEAT || — || align=right | 4.6 km || 
|-id=896 bgcolor=#d6d6d6
| 78896 ||  || — || September 16, 2003 || Kitt Peak || Spacewatch || KOR || align=right | 3.3 km || 
|-id=897 bgcolor=#E9E9E9
| 78897 ||  || — || September 16, 2003 || Kitt Peak || Spacewatch || — || align=right | 2.4 km || 
|-id=898 bgcolor=#fefefe
| 78898 ||  || — || September 17, 2003 || Anderson Mesa || LONEOS || — || align=right | 2.0 km || 
|-id=899 bgcolor=#E9E9E9
| 78899 ||  || — || September 17, 2003 || Socorro || LINEAR || — || align=right | 2.0 km || 
|-id=900 bgcolor=#E9E9E9
| 78900 ||  || — || September 18, 2003 || Anderson Mesa || LONEOS || MAR || align=right | 1.9 km || 
|}

78901–79000 

|-bgcolor=#d6d6d6
| 78901 ||  || — || September 19, 2003 || Črni Vrh || Črni Vrh || — || align=right | 5.1 km || 
|-id=902 bgcolor=#d6d6d6
| 78902 ||  || — || September 19, 2003 || Socorro || LINEAR || — || align=right | 6.5 km || 
|-id=903 bgcolor=#E9E9E9
| 78903 ||  || — || September 19, 2003 || Kitt Peak || Spacewatch || — || align=right | 2.6 km || 
|-id=904 bgcolor=#E9E9E9
| 78904 ||  || — || September 19, 2003 || Kitt Peak || Spacewatch || — || align=right | 5.0 km || 
|-id=905 bgcolor=#fefefe
| 78905 Seanokeefe ||  ||  || September 16, 2003 || Palomar || NEAT || PHO || align=right | 3.6 km || 
|-id=906 bgcolor=#fefefe
| 78906 ||  || — || September 16, 2003 || Kitt Peak || Spacewatch || — || align=right | 1.4 km || 
|-id=907 bgcolor=#fefefe
| 78907 ||  || — || September 18, 2003 || Socorro || LINEAR || FLO || align=right | 1.3 km || 
|-id=908 bgcolor=#E9E9E9
| 78908 ||  || — || September 18, 2003 || Socorro || LINEAR || IAN || align=right | 2.5 km || 
|-id=909 bgcolor=#d6d6d6
| 78909 ||  || — || September 19, 2003 || Palomar || NEAT || EOS || align=right | 4.7 km || 
|-id=910 bgcolor=#d6d6d6
| 78910 ||  || — || September 19, 2003 || Palomar || NEAT || — || align=right | 8.2 km || 
|-id=911 bgcolor=#E9E9E9
| 78911 ||  || — || September 19, 2003 || Palomar || NEAT || — || align=right | 3.2 km || 
|-id=912 bgcolor=#d6d6d6
| 78912 ||  || — || September 19, 2003 || Haleakala || NEAT || — || align=right | 10 km || 
|-id=913 bgcolor=#d6d6d6
| 78913 ||  || — || September 19, 2003 || Haleakala || NEAT || NAE || align=right | 6.8 km || 
|-id=914 bgcolor=#d6d6d6
| 78914 ||  || — || September 20, 2003 || Palomar || NEAT || — || align=right | 4.5 km || 
|-id=915 bgcolor=#E9E9E9
| 78915 ||  || — || September 20, 2003 || Palomar || NEAT || WIT || align=right | 2.3 km || 
|-id=916 bgcolor=#fefefe
| 78916 ||  || — || September 20, 2003 || Socorro || LINEAR || — || align=right | 1.9 km || 
|-id=917 bgcolor=#d6d6d6
| 78917 ||  || — || September 20, 2003 || Palomar || NEAT || LIX || align=right | 7.8 km || 
|-id=918 bgcolor=#E9E9E9
| 78918 ||  || — || September 20, 2003 || Palomar || NEAT || MIT || align=right | 4.9 km || 
|-id=919 bgcolor=#fefefe
| 78919 ||  || — || September 20, 2003 || Palomar || NEAT || — || align=right | 2.0 km || 
|-id=920 bgcolor=#fefefe
| 78920 ||  || — || September 20, 2003 || Palomar || NEAT || V || align=right | 1.2 km || 
|-id=921 bgcolor=#fefefe
| 78921 ||  || — || September 20, 2003 || Palomar || NEAT || CLA || align=right | 2.2 km || 
|-id=922 bgcolor=#fefefe
| 78922 ||  || — || September 20, 2003 || Kitt Peak || Spacewatch || — || align=right | 1.9 km || 
|-id=923 bgcolor=#E9E9E9
| 78923 ||  || — || September 20, 2003 || Palomar || NEAT || HOF || align=right | 6.1 km || 
|-id=924 bgcolor=#fefefe
| 78924 ||  || — || September 20, 2003 || Haleakala || NEAT || — || align=right | 1.7 km || 
|-id=925 bgcolor=#fefefe
| 78925 ||  || — || September 18, 2003 || Goodricke-Pigott || R. A. Tucker || FLO || align=right | 1.4 km || 
|-id=926 bgcolor=#E9E9E9
| 78926 ||  || — || September 19, 2003 || Kitt Peak || Spacewatch || — || align=right | 2.9 km || 
|-id=927 bgcolor=#fefefe
| 78927 ||  || — || September 20, 2003 || Socorro || LINEAR || — || align=right | 1.0 km || 
|-id=928 bgcolor=#d6d6d6
| 78928 ||  || — || September 20, 2003 || Fountain Hills || C. W. Juels, P. R. Holvorcem || — || align=right | 8.5 km || 
|-id=929 bgcolor=#fefefe
| 78929 ||  || — || September 20, 2003 || Palomar || NEAT || V || align=right | 1.0 km || 
|-id=930 bgcolor=#fefefe
| 78930 ||  || — || September 20, 2003 || Socorro || LINEAR || — || align=right | 1.8 km || 
|-id=931 bgcolor=#E9E9E9
| 78931 ||  || — || September 20, 2003 || Socorro || LINEAR || — || align=right | 4.2 km || 
|-id=932 bgcolor=#d6d6d6
| 78932 ||  || — || September 19, 2003 || Socorro || LINEAR || — || align=right | 9.7 km || 
|-id=933 bgcolor=#d6d6d6
| 78933 ||  || — || September 19, 2003 || Palomar || NEAT || — || align=right | 7.9 km || 
|-id=934 bgcolor=#fefefe
| 78934 ||  || — || September 20, 2003 || Haleakala || NEAT || — || align=right | 2.0 km || 
|-id=935 bgcolor=#d6d6d6
| 78935 ||  || — || September 16, 2003 || Socorro || LINEAR || — || align=right | 15 km || 
|-id=936 bgcolor=#d6d6d6
| 78936 ||  || — || September 19, 2003 || Anderson Mesa || LONEOS || EOS || align=right | 3.7 km || 
|-id=937 bgcolor=#fefefe
| 78937 ||  || — || September 19, 2003 || Anderson Mesa || LONEOS || MAS || align=right | 1.3 km || 
|-id=938 bgcolor=#E9E9E9
| 78938 ||  || — || September 19, 2003 || Anderson Mesa || LONEOS || EUN || align=right | 2.4 km || 
|-id=939 bgcolor=#E9E9E9
| 78939 ||  || — || September 18, 2003 || Socorro || LINEAR || — || align=right | 4.4 km || 
|-id=940 bgcolor=#fefefe
| 78940 ||  || — || September 22, 2003 || Socorro || LINEAR || — || align=right | 1.8 km || 
|-id=941 bgcolor=#fefefe
| 78941 ||  || — || September 23, 2003 || Haleakala || NEAT || — || align=right | 1.8 km || 
|-id=942 bgcolor=#fefefe
| 78942 ||  || — || September 20, 2003 || Socorro || LINEAR || — || align=right | 1.5 km || 
|-id=943 bgcolor=#d6d6d6
| 78943 ||  || — || September 18, 2003 || Campo Imperatore || CINEOS || EOS || align=right | 5.5 km || 
|-id=944 bgcolor=#fefefe
| 78944 ||  || — || September 18, 2003 || Socorro || LINEAR || — || align=right | 1.3 km || 
|-id=945 bgcolor=#d6d6d6
| 78945 ||  || — || September 24, 2003 || Palomar || NEAT || — || align=right | 2.7 km || 
|-id=946 bgcolor=#E9E9E9
| 78946 ||  || — || September 19, 2003 || Palomar || NEAT || MIT || align=right | 8.1 km || 
|-id=947 bgcolor=#d6d6d6
| 78947 ||  || — || September 19, 2003 || Palomar || NEAT || — || align=right | 3.8 km || 
|-id=948 bgcolor=#d6d6d6
| 78948 ||  || — || September 20, 2003 || Campo Imperatore || CINEOS || — || align=right | 6.3 km || 
|-id=949 bgcolor=#fefefe
| 78949 ||  || — || September 21, 2003 || Anderson Mesa || LONEOS || FLO || align=right | 1.4 km || 
|-id=950 bgcolor=#d6d6d6
| 78950 ||  || — || September 22, 2003 || Palomar || NEAT || KOR || align=right | 2.6 km || 
|-id=951 bgcolor=#E9E9E9
| 78951 ||  || — || September 24, 2003 || Haleakala || NEAT || — || align=right | 4.7 km || 
|-id=952 bgcolor=#E9E9E9
| 78952 ||  || — || September 26, 2003 || Desert Eagle || W. K. Y. Yeung || WIT || align=right | 1.6 km || 
|-id=953 bgcolor=#d6d6d6
| 78953 ||  || — || September 27, 2003 || Desert Eagle || W. K. Y. Yeung || — || align=right | 5.9 km || 
|-id=954 bgcolor=#d6d6d6
| 78954 ||  || — || September 28, 2003 || Desert Eagle || W. K. Y. Yeung || THM || align=right | 4.2 km || 
|-id=955 bgcolor=#fefefe
| 78955 ||  || — || September 26, 2003 || Uccle || E. W. Elst, H. Debehogne || — || align=right | 2.4 km || 
|-id=956 bgcolor=#E9E9E9
| 78956 ||  || — || September 27, 2003 || Desert Eagle || W. K. Y. Yeung || — || align=right | 5.6 km || 
|-id=957 bgcolor=#d6d6d6
| 78957 ||  || — || September 26, 2003 || Socorro || LINEAR || URS || align=right | 11 km || 
|-id=958 bgcolor=#d6d6d6
| 78958 ||  || — || September 26, 2003 || Socorro || LINEAR || — || align=right | 5.7 km || 
|-id=959 bgcolor=#d6d6d6
| 78959 ||  || — || September 24, 2003 || Haleakala || NEAT || HYG || align=right | 6.6 km || 
|-id=960 bgcolor=#E9E9E9
| 78960 ||  || — || September 26, 2003 || Socorro || LINEAR || — || align=right | 4.5 km || 
|-id=961 bgcolor=#E9E9E9
| 78961 ||  || — || September 26, 2003 || Socorro || LINEAR || — || align=right | 3.6 km || 
|-id=962 bgcolor=#fefefe
| 78962 ||  || — || September 26, 2003 || Socorro || LINEAR || FLO || align=right | 1.1 km || 
|-id=963 bgcolor=#d6d6d6
| 78963 ||  || — || September 26, 2003 || Socorro || LINEAR || — || align=right | 4.1 km || 
|-id=964 bgcolor=#fefefe
| 78964 ||  || — || September 26, 2003 || Socorro || LINEAR || V || align=right | 1.5 km || 
|-id=965 bgcolor=#d6d6d6
| 78965 ||  || — || September 27, 2003 || Socorro || LINEAR || — || align=right | 7.2 km || 
|-id=966 bgcolor=#d6d6d6
| 78966 ||  || — || September 29, 2003 || Socorro || LINEAR || KOR || align=right | 2.6 km || 
|-id=967 bgcolor=#d6d6d6
| 78967 ||  || — || September 30, 2003 || Socorro || LINEAR || — || align=right | 10 km || 
|-id=968 bgcolor=#fefefe
| 78968 ||  || — || September 29, 2003 || Socorro || LINEAR || — || align=right | 4.1 km || 
|-id=969 bgcolor=#d6d6d6
| 78969 ||  || — || September 28, 2003 || Socorro || LINEAR || — || align=right | 7.9 km || 
|-id=970 bgcolor=#d6d6d6
| 78970 ||  || — || September 18, 2003 || Haleakala || NEAT || — || align=right | 7.3 km || 
|-id=971 bgcolor=#fefefe
| 78971 ||  || — || September 17, 2003 || Palomar || NEAT || FLO || align=right | 1.2 km || 
|-id=972 bgcolor=#d6d6d6
| 78972 ||  || — || September 17, 2003 || Palomar || NEAT || — || align=right | 4.9 km || 
|-id=973 bgcolor=#E9E9E9
| 78973 ||  || — || September 30, 2003 || Socorro || LINEAR || — || align=right | 2.2 km || 
|-id=974 bgcolor=#d6d6d6
| 78974 ||  || — || September 26, 2003 || Socorro || LINEAR || — || align=right | 8.8 km || 
|-id=975 bgcolor=#fefefe
| 78975 ||  || — || September 19, 2003 || Socorro || LINEAR || FLO || align=right | 1.1 km || 
|-id=976 bgcolor=#E9E9E9
| 78976 ||  || — || October 14, 2003 || Anderson Mesa || LONEOS || — || align=right | 2.9 km || 
|-id=977 bgcolor=#fefefe
| 78977 ||  || — || October 15, 2003 || Anderson Mesa || LONEOS || — || align=right | 3.4 km || 
|-id=978 bgcolor=#E9E9E9
| 78978 ||  || — || October 19, 2003 || Kitt Peak || Spacewatch || — || align=right | 3.2 km || 
|-id=979 bgcolor=#fefefe
| 78979 ||  || — || October 23, 2003 || Anderson Mesa || LONEOS || — || align=right | 1.9 km || 
|-id=980 bgcolor=#d6d6d6
| 78980 ||  || — || October 16, 2003 || Palomar || NEAT || — || align=right | 5.5 km || 
|-id=981 bgcolor=#d6d6d6
| 78981 ||  || — || October 16, 2003 || Kitt Peak || Spacewatch || KOR || align=right | 2.4 km || 
|-id=982 bgcolor=#E9E9E9
| 78982 ||  || — || October 16, 2003 || Haleakala || NEAT || DOR || align=right | 5.8 km || 
|-id=983 bgcolor=#E9E9E9
| 78983 ||  || — || October 16, 2003 || Anderson Mesa || LONEOS || — || align=right | 4.6 km || 
|-id=984 bgcolor=#d6d6d6
| 78984 ||  || — || October 16, 2003 || Palomar || NEAT || — || align=right | 5.7 km || 
|-id=985 bgcolor=#E9E9E9
| 78985 ||  || — || October 18, 2003 || Palomar || NEAT || EUN || align=right | 3.2 km || 
|-id=986 bgcolor=#d6d6d6
| 78986 ||  || — || October 16, 2003 || Palomar || NEAT || EUP || align=right | 9.1 km || 
|-id=987 bgcolor=#d6d6d6
| 78987 ||  || — || October 16, 2003 || Palomar || NEAT || — || align=right | 6.5 km || 
|-id=988 bgcolor=#E9E9E9
| 78988 ||  || — || October 18, 2003 || Palomar || NEAT || — || align=right | 3.5 km || 
|-id=989 bgcolor=#d6d6d6
| 78989 ||  || — || October 18, 2003 || Haleakala || NEAT || — || align=right | 4.6 km || 
|-id=990 bgcolor=#E9E9E9
| 78990 ||  || — || October 20, 2003 || Socorro || LINEAR || — || align=right | 3.7 km || 
|-id=991 bgcolor=#d6d6d6
| 78991 ||  || — || October 22, 2003 || Socorro || LINEAR || EOS || align=right | 5.2 km || 
|-id=992 bgcolor=#d6d6d6
| 78992 ||  || — || October 22, 2003 || Socorro || LINEAR || — || align=right | 5.0 km || 
|-id=993 bgcolor=#fefefe
| 78993 ||  || — || October 22, 2003 || Kitt Peak || Spacewatch || MAS || align=right | 1.6 km || 
|-id=994 bgcolor=#E9E9E9
| 78994 ||  || — || October 22, 2003 || Kitt Peak || Spacewatch || — || align=right | 3.1 km || 
|-id=995 bgcolor=#fefefe
| 78995 || 2047 P-L || — || September 24, 1960 || Palomar || PLS || — || align=right | 1.8 km || 
|-id=996 bgcolor=#fefefe
| 78996 || 2080 P-L || — || September 24, 1960 || Palomar || PLS || — || align=right | 1.6 km || 
|-id=997 bgcolor=#E9E9E9
| 78997 || 2121 P-L || — || September 24, 1960 || Palomar || PLS || — || align=right | 2.9 km || 
|-id=998 bgcolor=#d6d6d6
| 78998 || 2504 P-L || — || September 24, 1960 || Palomar || PLS || EOS || align=right | 5.3 km || 
|-id=999 bgcolor=#E9E9E9
| 78999 || 2614 P-L || — || September 24, 1960 || Palomar || PLS || — || align=right | 3.0 km || 
|-id=000 bgcolor=#E9E9E9
| 79000 || 2689 P-L || — || September 24, 1960 || Palomar || PLS || HOF || align=right | 5.5 km || 
|}

References

External links 
 Discovery Circumstances: Numbered Minor Planets (75001)–(80000) (IAU Minor Planet Center)

0078